

106001–106100 

|-bgcolor=#C2FFFF
| 106001 ||  || — || September 23, 2000 || Socorro || LINEAR || L5 || align=right | 17 km || 
|-id=002 bgcolor=#fefefe
| 106002 ||  || — || September 23, 2000 || Socorro || LINEAR || FLO || align=right | 2.1 km || 
|-id=003 bgcolor=#d6d6d6
| 106003 ||  || — || September 23, 2000 || Socorro || LINEAR || EOS || align=right | 4.1 km || 
|-id=004 bgcolor=#d6d6d6
| 106004 ||  || — || September 23, 2000 || Socorro || LINEAR || — || align=right | 3.4 km || 
|-id=005 bgcolor=#d6d6d6
| 106005 ||  || — || September 23, 2000 || Socorro || LINEAR || — || align=right | 4.3 km || 
|-id=006 bgcolor=#d6d6d6
| 106006 ||  || — || September 24, 2000 || Socorro || LINEAR || VER || align=right | 5.8 km || 
|-id=007 bgcolor=#d6d6d6
| 106007 ||  || — || September 26, 2000 || Socorro || LINEAR || — || align=right | 4.4 km || 
|-id=008 bgcolor=#fefefe
| 106008 ||  || — || September 27, 2000 || Socorro || LINEAR || V || align=right | 1.1 km || 
|-id=009 bgcolor=#d6d6d6
| 106009 ||  || — || September 27, 2000 || Socorro || LINEAR || — || align=right | 5.4 km || 
|-id=010 bgcolor=#d6d6d6
| 106010 ||  || — || September 27, 2000 || Socorro || LINEAR || — || align=right | 6.5 km || 
|-id=011 bgcolor=#d6d6d6
| 106011 ||  || — || September 27, 2000 || Socorro || LINEAR || — || align=right | 3.2 km || 
|-id=012 bgcolor=#fefefe
| 106012 ||  || — || September 27, 2000 || Socorro || LINEAR || FLO || align=right | 1.0 km || 
|-id=013 bgcolor=#d6d6d6
| 106013 ||  || — || September 27, 2000 || Socorro || LINEAR || EUP || align=right | 12 km || 
|-id=014 bgcolor=#d6d6d6
| 106014 ||  || — || September 27, 2000 || Socorro || LINEAR || — || align=right | 4.4 km || 
|-id=015 bgcolor=#fefefe
| 106015 ||  || — || September 27, 2000 || Socorro || LINEAR || — || align=right | 2.6 km || 
|-id=016 bgcolor=#d6d6d6
| 106016 ||  || — || September 27, 2000 || Socorro || LINEAR || — || align=right | 5.8 km || 
|-id=017 bgcolor=#fefefe
| 106017 ||  || — || September 27, 2000 || Socorro || LINEAR || — || align=right | 1.2 km || 
|-id=018 bgcolor=#d6d6d6
| 106018 ||  || — || September 27, 2000 || Socorro || LINEAR || — || align=right | 7.5 km || 
|-id=019 bgcolor=#d6d6d6
| 106019 ||  || — || September 27, 2000 || Socorro || LINEAR || EOS || align=right | 4.2 km || 
|-id=020 bgcolor=#d6d6d6
| 106020 ||  || — || September 27, 2000 || Socorro || LINEAR || ALA || align=right | 7.2 km || 
|-id=021 bgcolor=#d6d6d6
| 106021 ||  || — || September 27, 2000 || Socorro || LINEAR || EOS || align=right | 5.6 km || 
|-id=022 bgcolor=#d6d6d6
| 106022 ||  || — || September 28, 2000 || Socorro || LINEAR || — || align=right | 5.5 km || 
|-id=023 bgcolor=#d6d6d6
| 106023 ||  || — || September 28, 2000 || Socorro || LINEAR || — || align=right | 4.7 km || 
|-id=024 bgcolor=#d6d6d6
| 106024 ||  || — || September 28, 2000 || Socorro || LINEAR || — || align=right | 7.0 km || 
|-id=025 bgcolor=#E9E9E9
| 106025 ||  || — || September 28, 2000 || Socorro || LINEAR || — || align=right | 3.7 km || 
|-id=026 bgcolor=#d6d6d6
| 106026 ||  || — || September 28, 2000 || Socorro || LINEAR || — || align=right | 7.9 km || 
|-id=027 bgcolor=#fefefe
| 106027 ||  || — || September 28, 2000 || Socorro || LINEAR || — || align=right | 1.5 km || 
|-id=028 bgcolor=#d6d6d6
| 106028 ||  || — || September 28, 2000 || Socorro || LINEAR || — || align=right | 4.0 km || 
|-id=029 bgcolor=#d6d6d6
| 106029 ||  || — || September 28, 2000 || Socorro || LINEAR || — || align=right | 5.9 km || 
|-id=030 bgcolor=#fefefe
| 106030 ||  || — || September 28, 2000 || Socorro || LINEAR || — || align=right | 2.1 km || 
|-id=031 bgcolor=#d6d6d6
| 106031 ||  || — || September 28, 2000 || Socorro || LINEAR || — || align=right | 7.8 km || 
|-id=032 bgcolor=#d6d6d6
| 106032 ||  || — || September 28, 2000 || Socorro || LINEAR || — || align=right | 6.0 km || 
|-id=033 bgcolor=#d6d6d6
| 106033 ||  || — || September 28, 2000 || Socorro || LINEAR || VER || align=right | 7.7 km || 
|-id=034 bgcolor=#d6d6d6
| 106034 ||  || — || September 28, 2000 || Socorro || LINEAR || — || align=right | 5.6 km || 
|-id=035 bgcolor=#d6d6d6
| 106035 ||  || — || September 28, 2000 || Socorro || LINEAR || EOS || align=right | 4.5 km || 
|-id=036 bgcolor=#d6d6d6
| 106036 ||  || — || September 30, 2000 || Socorro || LINEAR || — || align=right | 8.0 km || 
|-id=037 bgcolor=#d6d6d6
| 106037 ||  || — || September 30, 2000 || Socorro || LINEAR || EOS || align=right | 4.0 km || 
|-id=038 bgcolor=#d6d6d6
| 106038 ||  || — || September 30, 2000 || Socorro || LINEAR || — || align=right | 6.4 km || 
|-id=039 bgcolor=#d6d6d6
| 106039 ||  || — || September 30, 2000 || Socorro || LINEAR || CHA || align=right | 4.1 km || 
|-id=040 bgcolor=#fefefe
| 106040 ||  || — || September 30, 2000 || Socorro || LINEAR || V || align=right | 1.5 km || 
|-id=041 bgcolor=#d6d6d6
| 106041 ||  || — || September 30, 2000 || Socorro || LINEAR || — || align=right | 7.7 km || 
|-id=042 bgcolor=#d6d6d6
| 106042 ||  || — || September 30, 2000 || Socorro || LINEAR || — || align=right | 6.6 km || 
|-id=043 bgcolor=#d6d6d6
| 106043 ||  || — || September 30, 2000 || Socorro || LINEAR || — || align=right | 7.6 km || 
|-id=044 bgcolor=#d6d6d6
| 106044 ||  || — || September 30, 2000 || Socorro || LINEAR || EOS || align=right | 3.9 km || 
|-id=045 bgcolor=#d6d6d6
| 106045 ||  || — || September 30, 2000 || Socorro || LINEAR || — || align=right | 4.5 km || 
|-id=046 bgcolor=#d6d6d6
| 106046 ||  || — || September 30, 2000 || Socorro || LINEAR || EOS || align=right | 3.5 km || 
|-id=047 bgcolor=#d6d6d6
| 106047 ||  || — || September 30, 2000 || Socorro || LINEAR || — || align=right | 5.1 km || 
|-id=048 bgcolor=#fefefe
| 106048 ||  || — || September 30, 2000 || Socorro || LINEAR || — || align=right | 1.9 km || 
|-id=049 bgcolor=#fefefe
| 106049 ||  || — || September 30, 2000 || Socorro || LINEAR || — || align=right | 2.0 km || 
|-id=050 bgcolor=#fefefe
| 106050 ||  || — || September 30, 2000 || Socorro || LINEAR || FLO || align=right | 1.1 km || 
|-id=051 bgcolor=#d6d6d6
| 106051 ||  || — || September 27, 2000 || Socorro || LINEAR || URS || align=right | 8.1 km || 
|-id=052 bgcolor=#d6d6d6
| 106052 ||  || — || September 27, 2000 || Socorro || LINEAR || TIR || align=right | 8.2 km || 
|-id=053 bgcolor=#d6d6d6
| 106053 ||  || — || September 27, 2000 || Socorro || LINEAR || — || align=right | 13 km || 
|-id=054 bgcolor=#d6d6d6
| 106054 ||  || — || September 27, 2000 || Socorro || LINEAR || — || align=right | 3.1 km || 
|-id=055 bgcolor=#d6d6d6
| 106055 ||  || — || September 27, 2000 || Socorro || LINEAR || — || align=right | 6.9 km || 
|-id=056 bgcolor=#d6d6d6
| 106056 ||  || — || September 28, 2000 || Socorro || LINEAR || EUP || align=right | 10 km || 
|-id=057 bgcolor=#d6d6d6
| 106057 ||  || — || September 30, 2000 || Socorro || LINEAR || — || align=right | 8.4 km || 
|-id=058 bgcolor=#E9E9E9
| 106058 ||  || — || September 30, 2000 || Socorro || LINEAR || — || align=right | 5.8 km || 
|-id=059 bgcolor=#E9E9E9
| 106059 ||  || — || September 30, 2000 || Socorro || LINEAR || WAT || align=right | 4.2 km || 
|-id=060 bgcolor=#C2FFFF
| 106060 ||  || — || September 30, 2000 || Socorro || LINEAR || L5 || align=right | 17 km || 
|-id=061 bgcolor=#E9E9E9
| 106061 ||  || — || September 30, 2000 || Socorro || LINEAR || WAT || align=right | 3.7 km || 
|-id=062 bgcolor=#d6d6d6
| 106062 ||  || — || September 26, 2000 || Socorro || LINEAR || — || align=right | 4.5 km || 
|-id=063 bgcolor=#d6d6d6
| 106063 ||  || — || September 26, 2000 || Socorro || LINEAR || TIR || align=right | 10 km || 
|-id=064 bgcolor=#d6d6d6
| 106064 ||  || — || September 28, 2000 || Socorro || LINEAR || ALA || align=right | 4.7 km || 
|-id=065 bgcolor=#d6d6d6
| 106065 ||  || — || September 28, 2000 || Kitt Peak || Spacewatch || ANF || align=right | 2.7 km || 
|-id=066 bgcolor=#d6d6d6
| 106066 ||  || — || September 28, 2000 || Kitt Peak || Spacewatch || — || align=right | 4.0 km || 
|-id=067 bgcolor=#d6d6d6
| 106067 ||  || — || September 30, 2000 || Socorro || LINEAR || — || align=right | 4.8 km || 
|-id=068 bgcolor=#d6d6d6
| 106068 ||  || — || September 27, 2000 || Kitt Peak || Spacewatch || — || align=right | 5.7 km || 
|-id=069 bgcolor=#fefefe
| 106069 ||  || — || September 27, 2000 || Socorro || LINEAR || — || align=right | 1.9 km || 
|-id=070 bgcolor=#fefefe
| 106070 ||  || — || September 26, 2000 || Haleakala || NEAT || — || align=right | 1.4 km || 
|-id=071 bgcolor=#fefefe
| 106071 ||  || — || September 26, 2000 || Haleakala || NEAT || — || align=right | 1.9 km || 
|-id=072 bgcolor=#d6d6d6
| 106072 ||  || — || September 26, 2000 || Haleakala || NEAT || — || align=right | 8.0 km || 
|-id=073 bgcolor=#d6d6d6
| 106073 ||  || — || September 25, 2000 || Haleakala || NEAT || CHA || align=right | 3.9 km || 
|-id=074 bgcolor=#fefefe
| 106074 ||  || — || September 25, 2000 || Haleakala || NEAT || V || align=right | 1.9 km || 
|-id=075 bgcolor=#fefefe
| 106075 ||  || — || September 25, 2000 || Kitt Peak || Spacewatch || — || align=right | 1.4 km || 
|-id=076 bgcolor=#d6d6d6
| 106076 ||  || — || September 20, 2000 || Haleakala || NEAT || — || align=right | 4.8 km || 
|-id=077 bgcolor=#E9E9E9
| 106077 ||  || — || September 26, 2000 || Haleakala || NEAT || JUN || align=right | 1.8 km || 
|-id=078 bgcolor=#d6d6d6
| 106078 ||  || — || September 25, 2000 || Socorro || LINEAR || TIR || align=right | 4.3 km || 
|-id=079 bgcolor=#d6d6d6
| 106079 ||  || — || September 20, 2000 || Socorro || LINEAR || — || align=right | 6.7 km || 
|-id=080 bgcolor=#d6d6d6
| 106080 ||  || — || September 20, 2000 || Socorro || LINEAR || — || align=right | 6.3 km || 
|-id=081 bgcolor=#d6d6d6
| 106081 ||  || — || September 30, 2000 || Anderson Mesa || LONEOS || — || align=right | 5.7 km || 
|-id=082 bgcolor=#d6d6d6
| 106082 ||  || — || September 29, 2000 || Anderson Mesa || LONEOS || — || align=right | 6.0 km || 
|-id=083 bgcolor=#d6d6d6
| 106083 ||  || — || September 30, 2000 || Anderson Mesa || LONEOS || — || align=right | 5.1 km || 
|-id=084 bgcolor=#d6d6d6
| 106084 ||  || — || September 29, 2000 || Anderson Mesa || LONEOS || — || align=right | 6.4 km || 
|-id=085 bgcolor=#d6d6d6
| 106085 ||  || — || September 29, 2000 || Anderson Mesa || LONEOS || LIX || align=right | 6.2 km || 
|-id=086 bgcolor=#fefefe
| 106086 ||  || — || September 29, 2000 || Anderson Mesa || LONEOS || KLI || align=right | 3.3 km || 
|-id=087 bgcolor=#d6d6d6
| 106087 ||  || — || September 28, 2000 || Anderson Mesa || LONEOS || — || align=right | 6.6 km || 
|-id=088 bgcolor=#d6d6d6
| 106088 ||  || — || September 26, 2000 || Anderson Mesa || LONEOS || — || align=right | 7.0 km || 
|-id=089 bgcolor=#d6d6d6
| 106089 ||  || — || September 26, 2000 || Anderson Mesa || LONEOS || — || align=right | 5.8 km || 
|-id=090 bgcolor=#fefefe
| 106090 ||  || — || September 26, 2000 || Anderson Mesa || LONEOS || NYS || align=right | 1.5 km || 
|-id=091 bgcolor=#C2FFFF
| 106091 ||  || — || September 23, 2000 || Anderson Mesa || LONEOS || L5 || align=right | 15 km || 
|-id=092 bgcolor=#E9E9E9
| 106092 ||  || — || September 24, 2000 || Anderson Mesa || LONEOS || — || align=right | 3.8 km || 
|-id=093 bgcolor=#d6d6d6
| 106093 ||  || — || September 23, 2000 || Anderson Mesa || LONEOS || — || align=right | 7.4 km || 
|-id=094 bgcolor=#d6d6d6
| 106094 ||  || — || September 24, 2000 || Socorro || LINEAR || — || align=right | 4.8 km || 
|-id=095 bgcolor=#d6d6d6
| 106095 ||  || — || September 25, 2000 || Anderson Mesa || LONEOS || — || align=right | 4.7 km || 
|-id=096 bgcolor=#d6d6d6
| 106096 || 2000 TQ || — || October 2, 2000 || Emerald Lane || L. Ball || THM || align=right | 5.2 km || 
|-id=097 bgcolor=#d6d6d6
| 106097 ||  || — || October 4, 2000 || Desert Beaver || W. K. Y. Yeung || — || align=right | 7.3 km || 
|-id=098 bgcolor=#d6d6d6
| 106098 ||  || — || October 1, 2000 || Socorro || LINEAR || KOR || align=right | 2.5 km || 
|-id=099 bgcolor=#d6d6d6
| 106099 ||  || — || October 1, 2000 || Socorro || LINEAR || — || align=right | 4.1 km || 
|-id=100 bgcolor=#d6d6d6
| 106100 ||  || — || October 1, 2000 || Socorro || LINEAR || — || align=right | 3.6 km || 
|}

106101–106200 

|-bgcolor=#d6d6d6
| 106101 ||  || — || October 1, 2000 || Socorro || LINEAR || — || align=right | 4.8 km || 
|-id=102 bgcolor=#d6d6d6
| 106102 ||  || — || October 1, 2000 || Socorro || LINEAR || — || align=right | 5.0 km || 
|-id=103 bgcolor=#d6d6d6
| 106103 ||  || — || October 1, 2000 || Socorro || LINEAR || — || align=right | 4.0 km || 
|-id=104 bgcolor=#fefefe
| 106104 ||  || — || October 1, 2000 || Socorro || LINEAR || — || align=right | 1.3 km || 
|-id=105 bgcolor=#d6d6d6
| 106105 ||  || — || October 1, 2000 || Socorro || LINEAR || — || align=right | 4.7 km || 
|-id=106 bgcolor=#fefefe
| 106106 ||  || — || October 1, 2000 || Socorro || LINEAR || — || align=right | 1.7 km || 
|-id=107 bgcolor=#fefefe
| 106107 ||  || — || October 1, 2000 || Socorro || LINEAR || V || align=right | 1.4 km || 
|-id=108 bgcolor=#d6d6d6
| 106108 ||  || — || October 1, 2000 || Socorro || LINEAR || TEL || align=right | 2.8 km || 
|-id=109 bgcolor=#d6d6d6
| 106109 ||  || — || October 1, 2000 || Socorro || LINEAR || — || align=right | 3.2 km || 
|-id=110 bgcolor=#fefefe
| 106110 ||  || — || October 1, 2000 || Socorro || LINEAR || — || align=right | 1.4 km || 
|-id=111 bgcolor=#fefefe
| 106111 ||  || — || October 4, 2000 || Socorro || LINEAR || H || align=right | 1.3 km || 
|-id=112 bgcolor=#E9E9E9
| 106112 ||  || — || October 1, 2000 || Socorro || LINEAR || AST || align=right | 2.7 km || 
|-id=113 bgcolor=#d6d6d6
| 106113 ||  || — || October 2, 2000 || Socorro || LINEAR || EUP || align=right | 10 km || 
|-id=114 bgcolor=#d6d6d6
| 106114 ||  || — || October 2, 2000 || Socorro || LINEAR || — || align=right | 4.0 km || 
|-id=115 bgcolor=#d6d6d6
| 106115 ||  || — || October 3, 2000 || Socorro || LINEAR || KOR || align=right | 2.9 km || 
|-id=116 bgcolor=#d6d6d6
| 106116 ||  || — || October 4, 2000 || Socorro || LINEAR || — || align=right | 3.5 km || 
|-id=117 bgcolor=#d6d6d6
| 106117 ||  || — || October 3, 2000 || Socorro || LINEAR || EOS || align=right | 5.7 km || 
|-id=118 bgcolor=#d6d6d6
| 106118 ||  || — || October 1, 2000 || Socorro || LINEAR || — || align=right | 6.2 km || 
|-id=119 bgcolor=#d6d6d6
| 106119 ||  || — || October 4, 2000 || Socorro || LINEAR || — || align=right | 10 km || 
|-id=120 bgcolor=#fefefe
| 106120 ||  || — || October 4, 2000 || Socorro || LINEAR || H || align=right | 1.5 km || 
|-id=121 bgcolor=#fefefe
| 106121 ||  || — || October 4, 2000 || Socorro || LINEAR || H || align=right | 2.0 km || 
|-id=122 bgcolor=#fefefe
| 106122 ||  || — || October 7, 2000 || Desert Beaver || W. K. Y. Yeung || FLO || align=right | 1.6 km || 
|-id=123 bgcolor=#d6d6d6
| 106123 ||  || — || October 6, 2000 || Anderson Mesa || LONEOS || HYG || align=right | 5.2 km || 
|-id=124 bgcolor=#d6d6d6
| 106124 ||  || — || October 6, 2000 || Anderson Mesa || LONEOS || THM || align=right | 4.0 km || 
|-id=125 bgcolor=#fefefe
| 106125 ||  || — || October 6, 2000 || Anderson Mesa || LONEOS || — || align=right | 3.0 km || 
|-id=126 bgcolor=#d6d6d6
| 106126 ||  || — || October 6, 2000 || Anderson Mesa || LONEOS || — || align=right | 4.4 km || 
|-id=127 bgcolor=#d6d6d6
| 106127 ||  || — || October 6, 2000 || Anderson Mesa || LONEOS || — || align=right | 4.5 km || 
|-id=128 bgcolor=#fefefe
| 106128 ||  || — || October 1, 2000 || Socorro || LINEAR || V || align=right | 1.3 km || 
|-id=129 bgcolor=#d6d6d6
| 106129 ||  || — || October 1, 2000 || Socorro || LINEAR || EOS || align=right | 4.0 km || 
|-id=130 bgcolor=#d6d6d6
| 106130 ||  || — || October 1, 2000 || Socorro || LINEAR || — || align=right | 6.3 km || 
|-id=131 bgcolor=#d6d6d6
| 106131 ||  || — || October 1, 2000 || Socorro || LINEAR || — || align=right | 4.0 km || 
|-id=132 bgcolor=#d6d6d6
| 106132 ||  || — || October 1, 2000 || Socorro || LINEAR || — || align=right | 5.8 km || 
|-id=133 bgcolor=#fefefe
| 106133 ||  || — || October 1, 2000 || Socorro || LINEAR || — || align=right | 1.6 km || 
|-id=134 bgcolor=#d6d6d6
| 106134 ||  || — || October 1, 2000 || Socorro || LINEAR || — || align=right | 7.1 km || 
|-id=135 bgcolor=#E9E9E9
| 106135 ||  || — || October 1, 2000 || Socorro || LINEAR || — || align=right | 4.4 km || 
|-id=136 bgcolor=#d6d6d6
| 106136 ||  || — || October 1, 2000 || Socorro || LINEAR || EOS || align=right | 4.0 km || 
|-id=137 bgcolor=#E9E9E9
| 106137 ||  || — || October 1, 2000 || Socorro || LINEAR || — || align=right | 4.7 km || 
|-id=138 bgcolor=#d6d6d6
| 106138 ||  || — || October 1, 2000 || Socorro || LINEAR || URS || align=right | 7.9 km || 
|-id=139 bgcolor=#d6d6d6
| 106139 ||  || — || October 1, 2000 || Socorro || LINEAR || — || align=right | 3.4 km || 
|-id=140 bgcolor=#E9E9E9
| 106140 ||  || — || October 1, 2000 || Socorro || LINEAR || MAR || align=right | 2.3 km || 
|-id=141 bgcolor=#d6d6d6
| 106141 ||  || — || October 1, 2000 || Socorro || LINEAR || TEL || align=right | 2.8 km || 
|-id=142 bgcolor=#fefefe
| 106142 ||  || — || October 1, 2000 || Socorro || LINEAR || FLO || align=right | 1.3 km || 
|-id=143 bgcolor=#C2FFFF
| 106143 ||  || — || October 1, 2000 || Socorro || LINEAR || L5 || align=right | 19 km || 
|-id=144 bgcolor=#d6d6d6
| 106144 ||  || — || October 1, 2000 || Anderson Mesa || LONEOS || — || align=right | 4.6 km || 
|-id=145 bgcolor=#d6d6d6
| 106145 ||  || — || October 1, 2000 || Socorro || LINEAR || — || align=right | 6.6 km || 
|-id=146 bgcolor=#d6d6d6
| 106146 ||  || — || October 1, 2000 || Socorro || LINEAR || AEG || align=right | 7.4 km || 
|-id=147 bgcolor=#d6d6d6
| 106147 ||  || — || October 1, 2000 || Socorro || LINEAR || EUP || align=right | 7.7 km || 
|-id=148 bgcolor=#fefefe
| 106148 ||  || — || October 1, 2000 || Socorro || LINEAR || — || align=right | 1.7 km || 
|-id=149 bgcolor=#fefefe
| 106149 ||  || — || October 1, 2000 || Socorro || LINEAR || — || align=right | 1.9 km || 
|-id=150 bgcolor=#d6d6d6
| 106150 ||  || — || October 1, 2000 || Socorro || LINEAR || THM || align=right | 3.4 km || 
|-id=151 bgcolor=#fefefe
| 106151 ||  || — || October 2, 2000 || Socorro || LINEAR || — || align=right | 1.3 km || 
|-id=152 bgcolor=#d6d6d6
| 106152 ||  || — || October 2, 2000 || Anderson Mesa || LONEOS || — || align=right | 5.6 km || 
|-id=153 bgcolor=#d6d6d6
| 106153 ||  || — || October 2, 2000 || Anderson Mesa || LONEOS || — || align=right | 6.7 km || 
|-id=154 bgcolor=#d6d6d6
| 106154 ||  || — || October 2, 2000 || Anderson Mesa || LONEOS || EOS || align=right | 2.9 km || 
|-id=155 bgcolor=#d6d6d6
| 106155 ||  || — || October 2, 2000 || Anderson Mesa || LONEOS || — || align=right | 5.6 km || 
|-id=156 bgcolor=#d6d6d6
| 106156 ||  || — || October 2, 2000 || Anderson Mesa || LONEOS || — || align=right | 7.4 km || 
|-id=157 bgcolor=#d6d6d6
| 106157 ||  || — || October 2, 2000 || Anderson Mesa || LONEOS || — || align=right | 7.3 km || 
|-id=158 bgcolor=#fefefe
| 106158 ||  || — || October 2, 2000 || Anderson Mesa || LONEOS || — || align=right | 5.1 km || 
|-id=159 bgcolor=#d6d6d6
| 106159 ||  || — || October 2, 2000 || Anderson Mesa || LONEOS || — || align=right | 4.2 km || 
|-id=160 bgcolor=#C2FFFF
| 106160 ||  || — || October 2, 2000 || Anderson Mesa || LONEOS || L5 || align=right | 13 km || 
|-id=161 bgcolor=#d6d6d6
| 106161 ||  || — || October 2, 2000 || Socorro || LINEAR || THM || align=right | 4.3 km || 
|-id=162 bgcolor=#fefefe
| 106162 ||  || — || October 2, 2000 || Socorro || LINEAR || — || align=right | 1.1 km || 
|-id=163 bgcolor=#d6d6d6
| 106163 ||  || — || October 1, 2000 || Anderson Mesa || LONEOS || — || align=right | 4.3 km || 
|-id=164 bgcolor=#d6d6d6
| 106164 ||  || — || October 1, 2000 || Socorro || LINEAR || KOR || align=right | 2.5 km || 
|-id=165 bgcolor=#d6d6d6
| 106165 ||  || — || October 1, 2000 || Socorro || LINEAR || — || align=right | 4.1 km || 
|-id=166 bgcolor=#d6d6d6
| 106166 ||  || — || October 1, 2000 || Socorro || LINEAR || — || align=right | 4.6 km || 
|-id=167 bgcolor=#d6d6d6
| 106167 ||  || — || October 1, 2000 || Kitt Peak || Spacewatch || HYG || align=right | 7.0 km || 
|-id=168 bgcolor=#d6d6d6
| 106168 ||  || — || October 2, 2000 || Socorro || LINEAR || HYG || align=right | 9.0 km || 
|-id=169 bgcolor=#E9E9E9
| 106169 ||  || — || October 2, 2000 || Socorro || LINEAR || — || align=right | 1.9 km || 
|-id=170 bgcolor=#d6d6d6
| 106170 ||  || — || October 6, 2000 || Anderson Mesa || LONEOS || — || align=right | 7.0 km || 
|-id=171 bgcolor=#d6d6d6
| 106171 ||  || — || October 5, 2000 || Socorro || LINEAR || ALA || align=right | 6.7 km || 
|-id=172 bgcolor=#d6d6d6
| 106172 || 2000 UF || — || October 19, 2000 || Ondřejov || L. Kotková || — || align=right | 5.4 km || 
|-id=173 bgcolor=#fefefe
| 106173 ||  || — || October 22, 2000 || Bergisch Gladbach || W. Bickel || — || align=right | 1.2 km || 
|-id=174 bgcolor=#fefefe
| 106174 ||  || — || October 24, 2000 || Socorro || LINEAR || V || align=right | 1.6 km || 
|-id=175 bgcolor=#fefefe
| 106175 ||  || — || October 24, 2000 || Socorro || LINEAR || — || align=right | 2.6 km || 
|-id=176 bgcolor=#d6d6d6
| 106176 ||  || — || October 24, 2000 || Socorro || LINEAR || — || align=right | 5.9 km || 
|-id=177 bgcolor=#fefefe
| 106177 ||  || — || October 24, 2000 || Socorro || LINEAR || H || align=right | 1.2 km || 
|-id=178 bgcolor=#fefefe
| 106178 ||  || — || October 25, 2000 || Socorro || LINEAR || — || align=right | 1.7 km || 
|-id=179 bgcolor=#d6d6d6
| 106179 ||  || — || October 24, 2000 || Socorro || LINEAR || KOR || align=right | 2.9 km || 
|-id=180 bgcolor=#d6d6d6
| 106180 ||  || — || October 24, 2000 || Socorro || LINEAR || — || align=right | 6.8 km || 
|-id=181 bgcolor=#d6d6d6
| 106181 ||  || — || October 24, 2000 || Socorro || LINEAR || — || align=right | 7.2 km || 
|-id=182 bgcolor=#d6d6d6
| 106182 ||  || — || October 24, 2000 || Socorro || LINEAR || — || align=right | 5.5 km || 
|-id=183 bgcolor=#fefefe
| 106183 ||  || — || October 24, 2000 || Socorro || LINEAR || — || align=right | 3.2 km || 
|-id=184 bgcolor=#fefefe
| 106184 ||  || — || October 24, 2000 || Socorro || LINEAR || — || align=right | 1.4 km || 
|-id=185 bgcolor=#d6d6d6
| 106185 ||  || — || October 24, 2000 || Socorro || LINEAR || — || align=right | 9.3 km || 
|-id=186 bgcolor=#d6d6d6
| 106186 ||  || — || October 24, 2000 || Socorro || LINEAR || — || align=right | 8.5 km || 
|-id=187 bgcolor=#fefefe
| 106187 ||  || — || October 24, 2000 || Socorro || LINEAR || FLO || align=right | 1.2 km || 
|-id=188 bgcolor=#E9E9E9
| 106188 ||  || — || October 25, 2000 || Socorro || LINEAR || — || align=right | 1.8 km || 
|-id=189 bgcolor=#FA8072
| 106189 ||  || — || October 26, 2000 || Fountain Hills || C. W. Juels || H || align=right | 1.8 km || 
|-id=190 bgcolor=#E9E9E9
| 106190 ||  || — || October 24, 2000 || Socorro || LINEAR || — || align=right | 2.4 km || 
|-id=191 bgcolor=#d6d6d6
| 106191 ||  || — || October 24, 2000 || Socorro || LINEAR || — || align=right | 7.6 km || 
|-id=192 bgcolor=#E9E9E9
| 106192 ||  || — || October 25, 2000 || Socorro || LINEAR || — || align=right | 3.4 km || 
|-id=193 bgcolor=#d6d6d6
| 106193 ||  || — || October 25, 2000 || Socorro || LINEAR || — || align=right | 5.8 km || 
|-id=194 bgcolor=#fefefe
| 106194 ||  || — || October 25, 2000 || Socorro || LINEAR || — || align=right | 1.8 km || 
|-id=195 bgcolor=#d6d6d6
| 106195 ||  || — || October 29, 2000 || Ondřejov || P. Kušnirák || EOS || align=right | 4.6 km || 
|-id=196 bgcolor=#fefefe
| 106196 ||  || — || October 29, 2000 || Socorro || LINEAR || H || align=right | 1.4 km || 
|-id=197 bgcolor=#d6d6d6
| 106197 ||  || — || October 24, 2000 || Socorro || LINEAR || CRO || align=right | 6.6 km || 
|-id=198 bgcolor=#d6d6d6
| 106198 ||  || — || October 25, 2000 || Socorro || LINEAR || — || align=right | 5.4 km || 
|-id=199 bgcolor=#d6d6d6
| 106199 ||  || — || October 25, 2000 || Socorro || LINEAR || — || align=right | 7.8 km || 
|-id=200 bgcolor=#d6d6d6
| 106200 ||  || — || October 27, 2000 || Socorro || LINEAR || — || align=right | 5.1 km || 
|}

106201–106300 

|-bgcolor=#d6d6d6
| 106201 ||  || — || October 24, 2000 || Socorro || LINEAR || — || align=right | 8.2 km || 
|-id=202 bgcolor=#fefefe
| 106202 ||  || — || October 24, 2000 || Socorro || LINEAR || — || align=right | 1.7 km || 
|-id=203 bgcolor=#fefefe
| 106203 ||  || — || October 24, 2000 || Socorro || LINEAR || NYS || align=right | 1.5 km || 
|-id=204 bgcolor=#fefefe
| 106204 ||  || — || October 24, 2000 || Socorro || LINEAR || FLO || align=right | 1.4 km || 
|-id=205 bgcolor=#d6d6d6
| 106205 ||  || — || October 29, 2000 || Kitt Peak || Spacewatch || — || align=right | 4.1 km || 
|-id=206 bgcolor=#fefefe
| 106206 ||  || — || October 24, 2000 || Socorro || LINEAR || PHO || align=right | 2.2 km || 
|-id=207 bgcolor=#fefefe
| 106207 ||  || — || October 25, 2000 || Socorro || LINEAR || — || align=right | 1.9 km || 
|-id=208 bgcolor=#d6d6d6
| 106208 ||  || — || October 26, 2000 || Xinglong || SCAP || THM || align=right | 8.1 km || 
|-id=209 bgcolor=#d6d6d6
| 106209 ||  || — || October 29, 2000 || Kitt Peak || Spacewatch || THM || align=right | 4.7 km || 
|-id=210 bgcolor=#d6d6d6
| 106210 ||  || — || October 29, 2000 || Kitt Peak || Spacewatch || — || align=right | 5.2 km || 
|-id=211 bgcolor=#fefefe
| 106211 ||  || — || October 29, 2000 || Kitt Peak || Spacewatch || FLO || align=right | 1.8 km || 
|-id=212 bgcolor=#fefefe
| 106212 ||  || — || October 29, 2000 || Kitt Peak || Spacewatch || — || align=right | 1.5 km || 
|-id=213 bgcolor=#fefefe
| 106213 ||  || — || October 24, 2000 || Socorro || LINEAR || — || align=right | 1.7 km || 
|-id=214 bgcolor=#d6d6d6
| 106214 ||  || — || October 24, 2000 || Socorro || LINEAR || — || align=right | 6.6 km || 
|-id=215 bgcolor=#fefefe
| 106215 ||  || — || October 24, 2000 || Socorro || LINEAR || NYS || align=right | 1.1 km || 
|-id=216 bgcolor=#d6d6d6
| 106216 ||  || — || October 24, 2000 || Socorro || LINEAR || THM || align=right | 7.2 km || 
|-id=217 bgcolor=#d6d6d6
| 106217 ||  || — || October 24, 2000 || Socorro || LINEAR || — || align=right | 3.9 km || 
|-id=218 bgcolor=#fefefe
| 106218 ||  || — || October 24, 2000 || Socorro || LINEAR || NYS || align=right | 1.4 km || 
|-id=219 bgcolor=#fefefe
| 106219 ||  || — || October 24, 2000 || Socorro || LINEAR || — || align=right | 1.7 km || 
|-id=220 bgcolor=#fefefe
| 106220 ||  || — || October 24, 2000 || Socorro || LINEAR || — || align=right | 2.0 km || 
|-id=221 bgcolor=#fefefe
| 106221 ||  || — || October 24, 2000 || Socorro || LINEAR || NYS || align=right | 1.5 km || 
|-id=222 bgcolor=#d6d6d6
| 106222 ||  || — || October 24, 2000 || Socorro || LINEAR || — || align=right | 7.0 km || 
|-id=223 bgcolor=#d6d6d6
| 106223 ||  || — || October 24, 2000 || Socorro || LINEAR || HYG || align=right | 6.1 km || 
|-id=224 bgcolor=#fefefe
| 106224 ||  || — || October 24, 2000 || Socorro || LINEAR || — || align=right | 1.3 km || 
|-id=225 bgcolor=#d6d6d6
| 106225 ||  || — || October 24, 2000 || Socorro || LINEAR || KOR || align=right | 3.2 km || 
|-id=226 bgcolor=#d6d6d6
| 106226 ||  || — || October 24, 2000 || Socorro || LINEAR || EMA || align=right | 8.6 km || 
|-id=227 bgcolor=#fefefe
| 106227 ||  || — || October 24, 2000 || Socorro || LINEAR || EUT || align=right | 1.4 km || 
|-id=228 bgcolor=#d6d6d6
| 106228 ||  || — || October 24, 2000 || Socorro || LINEAR || — || align=right | 6.1 km || 
|-id=229 bgcolor=#d6d6d6
| 106229 ||  || — || October 24, 2000 || Socorro || LINEAR || — || align=right | 6.3 km || 
|-id=230 bgcolor=#d6d6d6
| 106230 ||  || — || October 24, 2000 || Socorro || LINEAR || MEL || align=right | 9.9 km || 
|-id=231 bgcolor=#d6d6d6
| 106231 ||  || — || October 24, 2000 || Socorro || LINEAR || THM || align=right | 6.1 km || 
|-id=232 bgcolor=#fefefe
| 106232 ||  || — || October 24, 2000 || Socorro || LINEAR || — || align=right | 2.1 km || 
|-id=233 bgcolor=#fefefe
| 106233 ||  || — || October 24, 2000 || Socorro || LINEAR || — || align=right | 1.4 km || 
|-id=234 bgcolor=#d6d6d6
| 106234 ||  || — || October 24, 2000 || Socorro || LINEAR || HYG || align=right | 8.3 km || 
|-id=235 bgcolor=#d6d6d6
| 106235 ||  || — || October 24, 2000 || Socorro || LINEAR || THM || align=right | 5.4 km || 
|-id=236 bgcolor=#d6d6d6
| 106236 ||  || — || October 24, 2000 || Socorro || LINEAR || — || align=right | 5.3 km || 
|-id=237 bgcolor=#fefefe
| 106237 ||  || — || October 24, 2000 || Socorro || LINEAR || NYS || align=right | 1.2 km || 
|-id=238 bgcolor=#d6d6d6
| 106238 ||  || — || October 24, 2000 || Socorro || LINEAR || THM || align=right | 4.1 km || 
|-id=239 bgcolor=#FA8072
| 106239 ||  || — || October 24, 2000 || Socorro || LINEAR || — || align=right | 1.9 km || 
|-id=240 bgcolor=#d6d6d6
| 106240 ||  || — || October 24, 2000 || Socorro || LINEAR || — || align=right | 7.9 km || 
|-id=241 bgcolor=#d6d6d6
| 106241 ||  || — || October 24, 2000 || Socorro || LINEAR || — || align=right | 3.6 km || 
|-id=242 bgcolor=#d6d6d6
| 106242 ||  || — || October 24, 2000 || Socorro || LINEAR || — || align=right | 4.5 km || 
|-id=243 bgcolor=#fefefe
| 106243 ||  || — || October 24, 2000 || Socorro || LINEAR || — || align=right | 1.7 km || 
|-id=244 bgcolor=#d6d6d6
| 106244 ||  || — || October 24, 2000 || Socorro || LINEAR || — || align=right | 3.6 km || 
|-id=245 bgcolor=#fefefe
| 106245 ||  || — || October 24, 2000 || Socorro || LINEAR || — || align=right | 1.6 km || 
|-id=246 bgcolor=#fefefe
| 106246 ||  || — || October 24, 2000 || Socorro || LINEAR || — || align=right | 2.3 km || 
|-id=247 bgcolor=#d6d6d6
| 106247 ||  || — || October 24, 2000 || Socorro || LINEAR || — || align=right | 3.6 km || 
|-id=248 bgcolor=#d6d6d6
| 106248 ||  || — || October 24, 2000 || Socorro || LINEAR || — || align=right | 6.0 km || 
|-id=249 bgcolor=#d6d6d6
| 106249 ||  || — || October 24, 2000 || Socorro || LINEAR || — || align=right | 6.0 km || 
|-id=250 bgcolor=#fefefe
| 106250 ||  || — || October 24, 2000 || Socorro || LINEAR || — || align=right | 1.7 km || 
|-id=251 bgcolor=#d6d6d6
| 106251 ||  || — || October 24, 2000 || Socorro || LINEAR || — || align=right | 7.3 km || 
|-id=252 bgcolor=#fefefe
| 106252 ||  || — || October 24, 2000 || Socorro || LINEAR || — || align=right | 1.4 km || 
|-id=253 bgcolor=#fefefe
| 106253 ||  || — || October 24, 2000 || Socorro || LINEAR || — || align=right | 1.4 km || 
|-id=254 bgcolor=#d6d6d6
| 106254 ||  || — || October 25, 2000 || Socorro || LINEAR || — || align=right | 4.1 km || 
|-id=255 bgcolor=#d6d6d6
| 106255 ||  || — || October 25, 2000 || Socorro || LINEAR || — || align=right | 5.0 km || 
|-id=256 bgcolor=#d6d6d6
| 106256 ||  || — || October 25, 2000 || Socorro || LINEAR || EOS || align=right | 3.8 km || 
|-id=257 bgcolor=#fefefe
| 106257 ||  || — || October 25, 2000 || Socorro || LINEAR || — || align=right | 1.5 km || 
|-id=258 bgcolor=#d6d6d6
| 106258 ||  || — || October 25, 2000 || Socorro || LINEAR || — || align=right | 6.5 km || 
|-id=259 bgcolor=#d6d6d6
| 106259 ||  || — || October 25, 2000 || Socorro || LINEAR || — || align=right | 3.3 km || 
|-id=260 bgcolor=#d6d6d6
| 106260 ||  || — || October 25, 2000 || Socorro || LINEAR || — || align=right | 6.9 km || 
|-id=261 bgcolor=#d6d6d6
| 106261 ||  || — || October 25, 2000 || Socorro || LINEAR || — || align=right | 3.5 km || 
|-id=262 bgcolor=#d6d6d6
| 106262 ||  || — || October 25, 2000 || Socorro || LINEAR || EOS || align=right | 4.4 km || 
|-id=263 bgcolor=#fefefe
| 106263 ||  || — || October 25, 2000 || Socorro || LINEAR || — || align=right | 1.1 km || 
|-id=264 bgcolor=#d6d6d6
| 106264 ||  || — || October 25, 2000 || Socorro || LINEAR || — || align=right | 5.2 km || 
|-id=265 bgcolor=#fefefe
| 106265 ||  || — || October 25, 2000 || Socorro || LINEAR || — || align=right | 1.7 km || 
|-id=266 bgcolor=#d6d6d6
| 106266 ||  || — || October 25, 2000 || Socorro || LINEAR || — || align=right | 6.8 km || 
|-id=267 bgcolor=#d6d6d6
| 106267 ||  || — || October 25, 2000 || Socorro || LINEAR || — || align=right | 8.1 km || 
|-id=268 bgcolor=#d6d6d6
| 106268 ||  || — || October 25, 2000 || Socorro || LINEAR || YAK || align=right | 5.0 km || 
|-id=269 bgcolor=#fefefe
| 106269 ||  || — || October 25, 2000 || Socorro || LINEAR || FLO || align=right | 1.1 km || 
|-id=270 bgcolor=#fefefe
| 106270 ||  || — || October 25, 2000 || Socorro || LINEAR || — || align=right | 1.8 km || 
|-id=271 bgcolor=#d6d6d6
| 106271 ||  || — || October 25, 2000 || Socorro || LINEAR || — || align=right | 4.5 km || 
|-id=272 bgcolor=#d6d6d6
| 106272 ||  || — || October 25, 2000 || Socorro || LINEAR || URS || align=right | 6.8 km || 
|-id=273 bgcolor=#d6d6d6
| 106273 ||  || — || October 25, 2000 || Socorro || LINEAR || — || align=right | 3.4 km || 
|-id=274 bgcolor=#fefefe
| 106274 ||  || — || October 25, 2000 || Socorro || LINEAR || V || align=right | 1.9 km || 
|-id=275 bgcolor=#E9E9E9
| 106275 ||  || — || October 25, 2000 || Socorro || LINEAR || — || align=right | 2.4 km || 
|-id=276 bgcolor=#d6d6d6
| 106276 ||  || — || October 25, 2000 || Socorro || LINEAR || HYG || align=right | 5.0 km || 
|-id=277 bgcolor=#fefefe
| 106277 ||  || — || October 25, 2000 || Socorro || LINEAR || — || align=right | 2.9 km || 
|-id=278 bgcolor=#d6d6d6
| 106278 ||  || — || October 25, 2000 || Socorro || LINEAR || HYG || align=right | 6.8 km || 
|-id=279 bgcolor=#d6d6d6
| 106279 ||  || — || October 25, 2000 || Socorro || LINEAR || — || align=right | 5.3 km || 
|-id=280 bgcolor=#d6d6d6
| 106280 ||  || — || October 25, 2000 || Socorro || LINEAR || — || align=right | 4.3 km || 
|-id=281 bgcolor=#d6d6d6
| 106281 ||  || — || October 26, 2000 || Socorro || LINEAR || — || align=right | 3.6 km || 
|-id=282 bgcolor=#d6d6d6
| 106282 ||  || — || October 30, 2000 || Socorro || LINEAR || HYG || align=right | 5.4 km || 
|-id=283 bgcolor=#d6d6d6
| 106283 ||  || — || October 31, 2000 || Socorro || LINEAR || — || align=right | 3.3 km || 
|-id=284 bgcolor=#fefefe
| 106284 ||  || — || October 29, 2000 || Socorro || LINEAR || H || align=right | 1.7 km || 
|-id=285 bgcolor=#d6d6d6
| 106285 ||  || — || October 24, 2000 || Socorro || LINEAR || EOS || align=right | 3.5 km || 
|-id=286 bgcolor=#E9E9E9
| 106286 ||  || — || October 24, 2000 || Socorro || LINEAR || — || align=right | 1.9 km || 
|-id=287 bgcolor=#fefefe
| 106287 ||  || — || October 24, 2000 || Socorro || LINEAR || NYS || align=right | 1.2 km || 
|-id=288 bgcolor=#fefefe
| 106288 ||  || — || October 24, 2000 || Socorro || LINEAR || — || align=right | 1.5 km || 
|-id=289 bgcolor=#fefefe
| 106289 ||  || — || October 24, 2000 || Socorro || LINEAR || FLO || align=right | 1.3 km || 
|-id=290 bgcolor=#d6d6d6
| 106290 ||  || — || October 24, 2000 || Socorro || LINEAR || — || align=right | 8.1 km || 
|-id=291 bgcolor=#fefefe
| 106291 ||  || — || October 24, 2000 || Socorro || LINEAR || V || align=right | 1.5 km || 
|-id=292 bgcolor=#fefefe
| 106292 ||  || — || October 24, 2000 || Socorro || LINEAR || — || align=right | 1.4 km || 
|-id=293 bgcolor=#d6d6d6
| 106293 ||  || — || October 24, 2000 || Socorro || LINEAR || — || align=right | 6.7 km || 
|-id=294 bgcolor=#d6d6d6
| 106294 ||  || — || October 26, 2000 || Socorro || LINEAR || — || align=right | 3.8 km || 
|-id=295 bgcolor=#fefefe
| 106295 ||  || — || October 26, 2000 || Socorro || LINEAR || MAS || align=right | 1.8 km || 
|-id=296 bgcolor=#fefefe
| 106296 ||  || — || October 30, 2000 || Socorro || LINEAR || V || align=right | 1.4 km || 
|-id=297 bgcolor=#d6d6d6
| 106297 ||  || — || October 31, 2000 || Socorro || LINEAR || HYG || align=right | 8.4 km || 
|-id=298 bgcolor=#d6d6d6
| 106298 ||  || — || October 31, 2000 || Socorro || LINEAR || EOS || align=right | 4.8 km || 
|-id=299 bgcolor=#d6d6d6
| 106299 ||  || — || October 31, 2000 || Socorro || LINEAR || — || align=right | 5.1 km || 
|-id=300 bgcolor=#fefefe
| 106300 ||  || — || October 31, 2000 || Socorro || LINEAR || NYS || align=right | 1.3 km || 
|}

106301–106400 

|-bgcolor=#d6d6d6
| 106301 ||  || — || October 31, 2000 || Socorro || LINEAR || — || align=right | 8.7 km || 
|-id=302 bgcolor=#d6d6d6
| 106302 ||  || — || October 31, 2000 || Socorro || LINEAR || 637 || align=right | 6.9 km || 
|-id=303 bgcolor=#d6d6d6
| 106303 ||  || — || October 31, 2000 || Socorro || LINEAR || — || align=right | 4.3 km || 
|-id=304 bgcolor=#d6d6d6
| 106304 ||  || — || October 31, 2000 || Socorro || LINEAR || ALA || align=right | 6.8 km || 
|-id=305 bgcolor=#E9E9E9
| 106305 ||  || — || October 24, 2000 || Socorro || LINEAR || — || align=right | 1.6 km || 
|-id=306 bgcolor=#d6d6d6
| 106306 ||  || — || October 25, 2000 || Socorro || LINEAR || HYG || align=right | 5.0 km || 
|-id=307 bgcolor=#d6d6d6
| 106307 ||  || — || October 25, 2000 || Socorro || LINEAR || — || align=right | 5.3 km || 
|-id=308 bgcolor=#fefefe
| 106308 ||  || — || October 25, 2000 || Socorro || LINEAR || — || align=right | 1.2 km || 
|-id=309 bgcolor=#d6d6d6
| 106309 ||  || — || October 25, 2000 || Socorro || LINEAR || — || align=right | 4.8 km || 
|-id=310 bgcolor=#d6d6d6
| 106310 ||  || — || October 25, 2000 || Socorro || LINEAR || — || align=right | 4.8 km || 
|-id=311 bgcolor=#d6d6d6
| 106311 ||  || — || October 25, 2000 || Socorro || LINEAR || — || align=right | 4.5 km || 
|-id=312 bgcolor=#d6d6d6
| 106312 ||  || — || October 25, 2000 || Socorro || LINEAR || — || align=right | 6.2 km || 
|-id=313 bgcolor=#d6d6d6
| 106313 ||  || — || October 25, 2000 || Socorro || LINEAR || — || align=right | 4.8 km || 
|-id=314 bgcolor=#d6d6d6
| 106314 ||  || — || October 25, 2000 || Socorro || LINEAR || — || align=right | 4.3 km || 
|-id=315 bgcolor=#d6d6d6
| 106315 ||  || — || October 25, 2000 || Socorro || LINEAR || — || align=right | 8.9 km || 
|-id=316 bgcolor=#d6d6d6
| 106316 ||  || — || October 25, 2000 || Socorro || LINEAR || — || align=right | 4.3 km || 
|-id=317 bgcolor=#d6d6d6
| 106317 ||  || — || October 25, 2000 || Socorro || LINEAR || EOS || align=right | 4.3 km || 
|-id=318 bgcolor=#d6d6d6
| 106318 ||  || — || October 25, 2000 || Socorro || LINEAR || — || align=right | 8.9 km || 
|-id=319 bgcolor=#d6d6d6
| 106319 ||  || — || October 25, 2000 || Socorro || LINEAR || — || align=right | 6.3 km || 
|-id=320 bgcolor=#d6d6d6
| 106320 ||  || — || October 25, 2000 || Socorro || LINEAR || HYG || align=right | 5.1 km || 
|-id=321 bgcolor=#fefefe
| 106321 ||  || — || October 25, 2000 || Socorro || LINEAR || — || align=right | 1.6 km || 
|-id=322 bgcolor=#fefefe
| 106322 ||  || — || October 25, 2000 || Socorro || LINEAR || FLO || align=right | 1.5 km || 
|-id=323 bgcolor=#d6d6d6
| 106323 ||  || — || October 25, 2000 || Socorro || LINEAR || — || align=right | 6.5 km || 
|-id=324 bgcolor=#d6d6d6
| 106324 ||  || — || October 25, 2000 || Socorro || LINEAR || — || align=right | 6.1 km || 
|-id=325 bgcolor=#d6d6d6
| 106325 ||  || — || October 25, 2000 || Socorro || LINEAR || — || align=right | 5.8 km || 
|-id=326 bgcolor=#d6d6d6
| 106326 ||  || — || October 25, 2000 || Socorro || LINEAR || — || align=right | 5.7 km || 
|-id=327 bgcolor=#d6d6d6
| 106327 ||  || — || October 25, 2000 || Socorro || LINEAR || — || align=right | 5.7 km || 
|-id=328 bgcolor=#d6d6d6
| 106328 ||  || — || October 25, 2000 || Socorro || LINEAR || HYG || align=right | 6.0 km || 
|-id=329 bgcolor=#fefefe
| 106329 ||  || — || October 25, 2000 || Socorro || LINEAR || FLO || align=right | 2.1 km || 
|-id=330 bgcolor=#d6d6d6
| 106330 ||  || — || October 25, 2000 || Socorro || LINEAR || — || align=right | 4.5 km || 
|-id=331 bgcolor=#d6d6d6
| 106331 ||  || — || October 29, 2000 || Socorro || LINEAR || — || align=right | 6.4 km || 
|-id=332 bgcolor=#fefefe
| 106332 ||  || — || October 30, 2000 || Socorro || LINEAR || FLO || align=right | 1.3 km || 
|-id=333 bgcolor=#d6d6d6
| 106333 ||  || — || October 30, 2000 || Socorro || LINEAR || — || align=right | 5.7 km || 
|-id=334 bgcolor=#d6d6d6
| 106334 ||  || — || October 30, 2000 || Socorro || LINEAR || — || align=right | 6.3 km || 
|-id=335 bgcolor=#fefefe
| 106335 ||  || — || October 30, 2000 || Socorro || LINEAR || FLO || align=right | 1.1 km || 
|-id=336 bgcolor=#fefefe
| 106336 ||  || — || October 30, 2000 || Socorro || LINEAR || — || align=right | 1.8 km || 
|-id=337 bgcolor=#fefefe
| 106337 ||  || — || October 30, 2000 || Socorro || LINEAR || V || align=right | 1.6 km || 
|-id=338 bgcolor=#d6d6d6
| 106338 ||  || — || October 30, 2000 || Socorro || LINEAR || — || align=right | 5.1 km || 
|-id=339 bgcolor=#d6d6d6
| 106339 ||  || — || October 31, 2000 || Socorro || LINEAR || HYG || align=right | 5.4 km || 
|-id=340 bgcolor=#fefefe
| 106340 ||  || — || October 31, 2000 || Socorro || LINEAR || FLO || align=right | 1.4 km || 
|-id=341 bgcolor=#d6d6d6
| 106341 ||  || — || October 31, 2000 || Socorro || LINEAR || — || align=right | 5.4 km || 
|-id=342 bgcolor=#fefefe
| 106342 ||  || — || October 31, 2000 || Socorro || LINEAR || — || align=right | 1.6 km || 
|-id=343 bgcolor=#fefefe
| 106343 ||  || — || October 25, 2000 || Socorro || LINEAR || H || align=right | 1.6 km || 
|-id=344 bgcolor=#d6d6d6
| 106344 ||  || — || October 26, 2000 || Kitt Peak || Spacewatch || — || align=right | 4.9 km || 
|-id=345 bgcolor=#E9E9E9
| 106345 ||  || — || October 29, 2000 || Kitt Peak || Spacewatch || — || align=right | 2.0 km || 
|-id=346 bgcolor=#d6d6d6
| 106346 ||  || — || October 29, 2000 || Kitt Peak || Spacewatch || — || align=right | 4.7 km || 
|-id=347 bgcolor=#d6d6d6
| 106347 ||  || — || October 31, 2000 || Socorro || LINEAR || — || align=right | 4.7 km || 
|-id=348 bgcolor=#fefefe
| 106348 ||  || — || October 25, 2000 || Socorro || LINEAR || MAS || align=right | 1.4 km || 
|-id=349 bgcolor=#fefefe
| 106349 || 2000 VE || — || November 1, 2000 || Desert Beaver || W. K. Y. Yeung || — || align=right | 2.0 km || 
|-id=350 bgcolor=#fefefe
| 106350 ||  || — || November 1, 2000 || Socorro || LINEAR || PHO || align=right | 3.2 km || 
|-id=351 bgcolor=#fefefe
| 106351 ||  || — || November 1, 2000 || Socorro || LINEAR || PHO || align=right | 3.7 km || 
|-id=352 bgcolor=#fefefe
| 106352 ||  || — || November 1, 2000 || Kitt Peak || Spacewatch || — || align=right | 1.2 km || 
|-id=353 bgcolor=#d6d6d6
| 106353 ||  || — || November 1, 2000 || Socorro || LINEAR || — || align=right | 4.9 km || 
|-id=354 bgcolor=#d6d6d6
| 106354 ||  || — || November 1, 2000 || Socorro || LINEAR || — || align=right | 5.2 km || 
|-id=355 bgcolor=#fefefe
| 106355 ||  || — || November 1, 2000 || Socorro || LINEAR || NYS || align=right | 1.4 km || 
|-id=356 bgcolor=#d6d6d6
| 106356 ||  || — || November 1, 2000 || Socorro || LINEAR || — || align=right | 5.1 km || 
|-id=357 bgcolor=#d6d6d6
| 106357 ||  || — || November 1, 2000 || Socorro || LINEAR || — || align=right | 5.6 km || 
|-id=358 bgcolor=#d6d6d6
| 106358 ||  || — || November 1, 2000 || Socorro || LINEAR || — || align=right | 5.9 km || 
|-id=359 bgcolor=#d6d6d6
| 106359 ||  || — || November 1, 2000 || Socorro || LINEAR || — || align=right | 5.7 km || 
|-id=360 bgcolor=#d6d6d6
| 106360 ||  || — || November 1, 2000 || Socorro || LINEAR || — || align=right | 6.9 km || 
|-id=361 bgcolor=#d6d6d6
| 106361 ||  || — || November 1, 2000 || Socorro || LINEAR || VER || align=right | 9.1 km || 
|-id=362 bgcolor=#d6d6d6
| 106362 ||  || — || November 1, 2000 || Socorro || LINEAR || — || align=right | 4.5 km || 
|-id=363 bgcolor=#d6d6d6
| 106363 ||  || — || November 1, 2000 || Socorro || LINEAR || THM || align=right | 6.4 km || 
|-id=364 bgcolor=#d6d6d6
| 106364 ||  || — || November 1, 2000 || Socorro || LINEAR || KOR || align=right | 3.0 km || 
|-id=365 bgcolor=#d6d6d6
| 106365 ||  || — || November 1, 2000 || Socorro || LINEAR || — || align=right | 4.9 km || 
|-id=366 bgcolor=#fefefe
| 106366 ||  || — || November 1, 2000 || Socorro || LINEAR || EUT || align=right | 1.1 km || 
|-id=367 bgcolor=#fefefe
| 106367 ||  || — || November 1, 2000 || Socorro || LINEAR || MAS || align=right | 1.2 km || 
|-id=368 bgcolor=#fefefe
| 106368 ||  || — || November 1, 2000 || Socorro || LINEAR || — || align=right | 3.4 km || 
|-id=369 bgcolor=#d6d6d6
| 106369 ||  || — || November 1, 2000 || Socorro || LINEAR || — || align=right | 4.4 km || 
|-id=370 bgcolor=#fefefe
| 106370 ||  || — || November 1, 2000 || Socorro || LINEAR || FLO || align=right | 1.2 km || 
|-id=371 bgcolor=#d6d6d6
| 106371 ||  || — || November 1, 2000 || Socorro || LINEAR || HYG || align=right | 5.4 km || 
|-id=372 bgcolor=#d6d6d6
| 106372 ||  || — || November 1, 2000 || Socorro || LINEAR || THM || align=right | 5.0 km || 
|-id=373 bgcolor=#d6d6d6
| 106373 ||  || — || November 1, 2000 || Socorro || LINEAR || — || align=right | 6.3 km || 
|-id=374 bgcolor=#fefefe
| 106374 ||  || — || November 1, 2000 || Socorro || LINEAR || — || align=right | 1.7 km || 
|-id=375 bgcolor=#d6d6d6
| 106375 ||  || — || November 1, 2000 || Socorro || LINEAR || HYG || align=right | 6.2 km || 
|-id=376 bgcolor=#d6d6d6
| 106376 ||  || — || November 1, 2000 || Socorro || LINEAR || — || align=right | 5.9 km || 
|-id=377 bgcolor=#fefefe
| 106377 ||  || — || November 1, 2000 || Socorro || LINEAR || — || align=right | 1.2 km || 
|-id=378 bgcolor=#d6d6d6
| 106378 ||  || — || November 1, 2000 || Socorro || LINEAR || — || align=right | 6.5 km || 
|-id=379 bgcolor=#d6d6d6
| 106379 ||  || — || November 1, 2000 || Socorro || LINEAR || VER || align=right | 8.1 km || 
|-id=380 bgcolor=#fefefe
| 106380 ||  || — || November 1, 2000 || Socorro || LINEAR || NYS || align=right | 1.1 km || 
|-id=381 bgcolor=#d6d6d6
| 106381 ||  || — || November 1, 2000 || Socorro || LINEAR || — || align=right | 5.7 km || 
|-id=382 bgcolor=#d6d6d6
| 106382 ||  || — || November 1, 2000 || Socorro || LINEAR || — || align=right | 3.9 km || 
|-id=383 bgcolor=#E9E9E9
| 106383 ||  || — || November 1, 2000 || Socorro || LINEAR || — || align=right | 3.5 km || 
|-id=384 bgcolor=#fefefe
| 106384 ||  || — || November 1, 2000 || Socorro || LINEAR || — || align=right | 2.0 km || 
|-id=385 bgcolor=#E9E9E9
| 106385 ||  || — || November 1, 2000 || Socorro || LINEAR || — || align=right | 2.0 km || 
|-id=386 bgcolor=#fefefe
| 106386 ||  || — || November 1, 2000 || Socorro || LINEAR || — || align=right | 1.7 km || 
|-id=387 bgcolor=#fefefe
| 106387 ||  || — || November 1, 2000 || Socorro || LINEAR || — || align=right | 1.8 km || 
|-id=388 bgcolor=#d6d6d6
| 106388 ||  || — || November 1, 2000 || Socorro || LINEAR || URS || align=right | 6.6 km || 
|-id=389 bgcolor=#d6d6d6
| 106389 ||  || — || November 1, 2000 || Socorro || LINEAR || — || align=right | 7.9 km || 
|-id=390 bgcolor=#d6d6d6
| 106390 ||  || — || November 1, 2000 || Socorro || LINEAR || — || align=right | 4.6 km || 
|-id=391 bgcolor=#fefefe
| 106391 ||  || — || November 1, 2000 || Socorro || LINEAR || FLO || align=right | 1.4 km || 
|-id=392 bgcolor=#d6d6d6
| 106392 ||  || — || November 1, 2000 || Socorro || LINEAR || — || align=right | 6.3 km || 
|-id=393 bgcolor=#d6d6d6
| 106393 ||  || — || November 1, 2000 || Socorro || LINEAR || — || align=right | 6.8 km || 
|-id=394 bgcolor=#d6d6d6
| 106394 ||  || — || November 1, 2000 || Socorro || LINEAR || — || align=right | 5.4 km || 
|-id=395 bgcolor=#fefefe
| 106395 ||  || — || November 1, 2000 || Socorro || LINEAR || — || align=right | 1.7 km || 
|-id=396 bgcolor=#fefefe
| 106396 ||  || — || November 1, 2000 || Socorro || LINEAR || NYS || align=right | 1.5 km || 
|-id=397 bgcolor=#fefefe
| 106397 ||  || — || November 1, 2000 || Socorro || LINEAR || — || align=right | 1.3 km || 
|-id=398 bgcolor=#fefefe
| 106398 ||  || — || November 1, 2000 || Socorro || LINEAR || — || align=right | 3.5 km || 
|-id=399 bgcolor=#d6d6d6
| 106399 ||  || — || November 1, 2000 || Socorro || LINEAR || — || align=right | 6.1 km || 
|-id=400 bgcolor=#fefefe
| 106400 ||  || — || November 1, 2000 || Socorro || LINEAR || — || align=right | 1.8 km || 
|}

106401–106500 

|-bgcolor=#fefefe
| 106401 ||  || — || November 1, 2000 || Socorro || LINEAR || — || align=right | 1.9 km || 
|-id=402 bgcolor=#fefefe
| 106402 ||  || — || November 1, 2000 || Socorro || LINEAR || FLO || align=right | 1.3 km || 
|-id=403 bgcolor=#fefefe
| 106403 ||  || — || November 1, 2000 || Socorro || LINEAR || NYS || align=right | 1.3 km || 
|-id=404 bgcolor=#fefefe
| 106404 ||  || — || November 1, 2000 || Socorro || LINEAR || — || align=right | 1.7 km || 
|-id=405 bgcolor=#d6d6d6
| 106405 ||  || — || November 1, 2000 || Socorro || LINEAR || — || align=right | 5.6 km || 
|-id=406 bgcolor=#fefefe
| 106406 ||  || — || November 1, 2000 || Socorro || LINEAR || — || align=right | 1.8 km || 
|-id=407 bgcolor=#fefefe
| 106407 ||  || — || November 1, 2000 || Socorro || LINEAR || — || align=right | 2.1 km || 
|-id=408 bgcolor=#d6d6d6
| 106408 ||  || — || November 1, 2000 || Socorro || LINEAR || EOS || align=right | 4.5 km || 
|-id=409 bgcolor=#fefefe
| 106409 ||  || — || November 1, 2000 || Socorro || LINEAR || — || align=right | 1.5 km || 
|-id=410 bgcolor=#fefefe
| 106410 ||  || — || November 1, 2000 || Socorro || LINEAR || NYS || align=right | 1.4 km || 
|-id=411 bgcolor=#fefefe
| 106411 ||  || — || November 1, 2000 || Socorro || LINEAR || — || align=right | 1.6 km || 
|-id=412 bgcolor=#fefefe
| 106412 ||  || — || November 1, 2000 || Socorro || LINEAR || — || align=right | 1.3 km || 
|-id=413 bgcolor=#d6d6d6
| 106413 ||  || — || November 1, 2000 || Socorro || LINEAR || — || align=right | 6.2 km || 
|-id=414 bgcolor=#d6d6d6
| 106414 ||  || — || November 1, 2000 || Socorro || LINEAR || — || align=right | 9.7 km || 
|-id=415 bgcolor=#d6d6d6
| 106415 ||  || — || November 1, 2000 || Socorro || LINEAR || HYG || align=right | 9.3 km || 
|-id=416 bgcolor=#d6d6d6
| 106416 ||  || — || November 1, 2000 || Socorro || LINEAR || HYG || align=right | 7.3 km || 
|-id=417 bgcolor=#fefefe
| 106417 ||  || — || November 1, 2000 || Socorro || LINEAR || H || align=right | 1.7 km || 
|-id=418 bgcolor=#fefefe
| 106418 ||  || — || November 1, 2000 || Socorro || LINEAR || — || align=right | 2.2 km || 
|-id=419 bgcolor=#d6d6d6
| 106419 ||  || — || November 1, 2000 || Socorro || LINEAR || — || align=right | 5.2 km || 
|-id=420 bgcolor=#fefefe
| 106420 ||  || — || November 1, 2000 || Socorro || LINEAR || — || align=right | 2.2 km || 
|-id=421 bgcolor=#fefefe
| 106421 ||  || — || November 1, 2000 || Xinglong || SCAP || — || align=right | 1.9 km || 
|-id=422 bgcolor=#fefefe
| 106422 ||  || — || November 1, 2000 || Socorro || LINEAR || — || align=right | 1.3 km || 
|-id=423 bgcolor=#fefefe
| 106423 ||  || — || November 1, 2000 || Socorro || LINEAR || — || align=right | 1.7 km || 
|-id=424 bgcolor=#fefefe
| 106424 ||  || — || November 1, 2000 || Socorro || LINEAR || V || align=right | 1.2 km || 
|-id=425 bgcolor=#d6d6d6
| 106425 ||  || — || November 1, 2000 || Socorro || LINEAR || HYG || align=right | 5.8 km || 
|-id=426 bgcolor=#d6d6d6
| 106426 ||  || — || November 1, 2000 || Socorro || LINEAR || — || align=right | 4.4 km || 
|-id=427 bgcolor=#d6d6d6
| 106427 ||  || — || November 1, 2000 || Socorro || LINEAR || HYG || align=right | 5.2 km || 
|-id=428 bgcolor=#d6d6d6
| 106428 ||  || — || November 1, 2000 || Socorro || LINEAR || — || align=right | 4.1 km || 
|-id=429 bgcolor=#d6d6d6
| 106429 ||  || — || November 1, 2000 || Socorro || LINEAR || — || align=right | 7.3 km || 
|-id=430 bgcolor=#d6d6d6
| 106430 ||  || — || November 2, 2000 || Socorro || LINEAR || KOR || align=right | 2.9 km || 
|-id=431 bgcolor=#fefefe
| 106431 ||  || — || November 2, 2000 || Socorro || LINEAR || FLO || align=right | 1.4 km || 
|-id=432 bgcolor=#d6d6d6
| 106432 ||  || — || November 2, 2000 || Socorro || LINEAR || — || align=right | 3.8 km || 
|-id=433 bgcolor=#fefefe
| 106433 ||  || — || November 2, 2000 || Socorro || LINEAR || — || align=right | 1.2 km || 
|-id=434 bgcolor=#fefefe
| 106434 ||  || — || November 2, 2000 || Socorro || LINEAR || — || align=right | 2.0 km || 
|-id=435 bgcolor=#d6d6d6
| 106435 ||  || — || November 2, 2000 || Socorro || LINEAR || — || align=right | 9.0 km || 
|-id=436 bgcolor=#d6d6d6
| 106436 ||  || — || November 3, 2000 || Socorro || LINEAR || — || align=right | 7.6 km || 
|-id=437 bgcolor=#fefefe
| 106437 ||  || — || November 3, 2000 || Socorro || LINEAR || FLO || align=right | 1.3 km || 
|-id=438 bgcolor=#d6d6d6
| 106438 ||  || — || November 3, 2000 || Socorro || LINEAR || — || align=right | 8.5 km || 
|-id=439 bgcolor=#fefefe
| 106439 ||  || — || November 3, 2000 || Socorro || LINEAR || — || align=right | 1.4 km || 
|-id=440 bgcolor=#d6d6d6
| 106440 ||  || — || November 3, 2000 || Socorro || LINEAR || EOS || align=right | 3.9 km || 
|-id=441 bgcolor=#E9E9E9
| 106441 ||  || — || November 3, 2000 || Socorro || LINEAR || MAR || align=right | 2.2 km || 
|-id=442 bgcolor=#fefefe
| 106442 ||  || — || November 3, 2000 || Socorro || LINEAR || — || align=right | 1.6 km || 
|-id=443 bgcolor=#d6d6d6
| 106443 ||  || — || November 3, 2000 || Socorro || LINEAR || HYG || align=right | 5.2 km || 
|-id=444 bgcolor=#d6d6d6
| 106444 ||  || — || November 3, 2000 || Socorro || LINEAR || EOS || align=right | 3.6 km || 
|-id=445 bgcolor=#fefefe
| 106445 ||  || — || November 3, 2000 || Socorro || LINEAR || V || align=right | 1.2 km || 
|-id=446 bgcolor=#fefefe
| 106446 ||  || — || November 3, 2000 || Socorro || LINEAR || — || align=right | 2.5 km || 
|-id=447 bgcolor=#d6d6d6
| 106447 ||  || — || November 3, 2000 || Socorro || LINEAR || — || align=right | 5.6 km || 
|-id=448 bgcolor=#fefefe
| 106448 ||  || — || November 3, 2000 || Socorro || LINEAR || — || align=right | 1.4 km || 
|-id=449 bgcolor=#d6d6d6
| 106449 ||  || — || November 3, 2000 || Socorro || LINEAR || EOS || align=right | 5.3 km || 
|-id=450 bgcolor=#d6d6d6
| 106450 ||  || — || November 3, 2000 || Socorro || LINEAR || — || align=right | 5.2 km || 
|-id=451 bgcolor=#fefefe
| 106451 ||  || — || November 3, 2000 || Socorro || LINEAR || FLO || align=right | 1.5 km || 
|-id=452 bgcolor=#d6d6d6
| 106452 ||  || — || November 6, 2000 || Socorro || LINEAR || — || align=right | 7.8 km || 
|-id=453 bgcolor=#d6d6d6
| 106453 ||  || — || November 1, 2000 || Socorro || LINEAR || — || align=right | 6.7 km || 
|-id=454 bgcolor=#d6d6d6
| 106454 ||  || — || November 1, 2000 || Kitt Peak || Spacewatch || — || align=right | 5.2 km || 
|-id=455 bgcolor=#fefefe
| 106455 ||  || — || November 9, 2000 || Socorro || LINEAR || H || align=right | 1.5 km || 
|-id=456 bgcolor=#fefefe
| 106456 ||  || — || November 3, 2000 || Socorro || LINEAR || V || align=right | 1.3 km || 
|-id=457 bgcolor=#E9E9E9
| 106457 || 2000 WC || — || November 16, 2000 || Kitt Peak || Spacewatch || — || align=right | 2.6 km || 
|-id=458 bgcolor=#fefefe
| 106458 ||  || — || November 17, 2000 || Socorro || LINEAR || H || align=right | 1.4 km || 
|-id=459 bgcolor=#fefefe
| 106459 ||  || — || November 19, 2000 || Socorro || LINEAR || H || align=right | 1.6 km || 
|-id=460 bgcolor=#d6d6d6
| 106460 ||  || — || November 19, 2000 || Socorro || LINEAR || — || align=right | 3.6 km || 
|-id=461 bgcolor=#d6d6d6
| 106461 ||  || — || November 19, 2000 || Socorro || LINEAR || URS || align=right | 9.9 km || 
|-id=462 bgcolor=#d6d6d6
| 106462 ||  || — || November 19, 2000 || Socorro || LINEAR || EOS || align=right | 3.8 km || 
|-id=463 bgcolor=#d6d6d6
| 106463 ||  || — || November 19, 2000 || Socorro || LINEAR || — || align=right | 5.3 km || 
|-id=464 bgcolor=#d6d6d6
| 106464 ||  || — || November 19, 2000 || Socorro || LINEAR || — || align=right | 6.7 km || 
|-id=465 bgcolor=#fefefe
| 106465 ||  || — || November 19, 2000 || Socorro || LINEAR || H || align=right | 1.2 km || 
|-id=466 bgcolor=#fefefe
| 106466 ||  || — || November 20, 2000 || Socorro || LINEAR || ERI || align=right | 2.7 km || 
|-id=467 bgcolor=#fefefe
| 106467 ||  || — || November 20, 2000 || Socorro || LINEAR || V || align=right | 1.0 km || 
|-id=468 bgcolor=#fefefe
| 106468 ||  || — || November 20, 2000 || Socorro || LINEAR || FLO || align=right | 1.3 km || 
|-id=469 bgcolor=#fefefe
| 106469 ||  || — || November 20, 2000 || Socorro || LINEAR || — || align=right | 4.4 km || 
|-id=470 bgcolor=#fefefe
| 106470 ||  || — || November 21, 2000 || Farpoint || G. Hug || — || align=right | 1.4 km || 
|-id=471 bgcolor=#fefefe
| 106471 ||  || — || November 24, 2000 || Elmira || A. J. Cecce || V || align=right | 1.5 km || 
|-id=472 bgcolor=#d6d6d6
| 106472 ||  || — || November 22, 2000 || Haleakala || NEAT || — || align=right | 4.4 km || 
|-id=473 bgcolor=#d6d6d6
| 106473 ||  || — || November 20, 2000 || Socorro || LINEAR || — || align=right | 4.8 km || 
|-id=474 bgcolor=#fefefe
| 106474 ||  || — || November 20, 2000 || Socorro || LINEAR || — || align=right | 1.7 km || 
|-id=475 bgcolor=#fefefe
| 106475 ||  || — || November 20, 2000 || Socorro || LINEAR || — || align=right | 1.6 km || 
|-id=476 bgcolor=#fefefe
| 106476 ||  || — || November 21, 2000 || Socorro || LINEAR || NYS || align=right | 3.5 km || 
|-id=477 bgcolor=#E9E9E9
| 106477 ||  || — || November 21, 2000 || Socorro || LINEAR || ADE || align=right | 3.6 km || 
|-id=478 bgcolor=#fefefe
| 106478 ||  || — || November 21, 2000 || Socorro || LINEAR || — || align=right | 1.6 km || 
|-id=479 bgcolor=#fefefe
| 106479 ||  || — || November 21, 2000 || Socorro || LINEAR || — || align=right | 1.7 km || 
|-id=480 bgcolor=#fefefe
| 106480 ||  || — || November 21, 2000 || Socorro || LINEAR || — || align=right | 2.2 km || 
|-id=481 bgcolor=#d6d6d6
| 106481 ||  || — || November 25, 2000 || Fountain Hills || C. W. Juels || — || align=right | 7.7 km || 
|-id=482 bgcolor=#fefefe
| 106482 ||  || — || November 20, 2000 || Socorro || LINEAR || — || align=right | 1.2 km || 
|-id=483 bgcolor=#d6d6d6
| 106483 ||  || — || November 20, 2000 || Socorro || LINEAR || ALA || align=right | 9.1 km || 
|-id=484 bgcolor=#fefefe
| 106484 ||  || — || November 20, 2000 || Socorro || LINEAR || — || align=right | 1.5 km || 
|-id=485 bgcolor=#d6d6d6
| 106485 ||  || — || November 20, 2000 || Socorro || LINEAR || — || align=right | 8.8 km || 
|-id=486 bgcolor=#d6d6d6
| 106486 ||  || — || November 20, 2000 || Socorro || LINEAR || HYG || align=right | 6.1 km || 
|-id=487 bgcolor=#d6d6d6
| 106487 ||  || — || November 20, 2000 || Socorro || LINEAR || — || align=right | 6.5 km || 
|-id=488 bgcolor=#fefefe
| 106488 ||  || — || November 20, 2000 || Socorro || LINEAR || — || align=right | 1.5 km || 
|-id=489 bgcolor=#E9E9E9
| 106489 ||  || — || November 20, 2000 || Socorro || LINEAR || EUN || align=right | 3.0 km || 
|-id=490 bgcolor=#d6d6d6
| 106490 ||  || — || November 21, 2000 || Socorro || LINEAR || — || align=right | 7.2 km || 
|-id=491 bgcolor=#d6d6d6
| 106491 ||  || — || November 23, 2000 || Haleakala || NEAT || TIR || align=right | 6.6 km || 
|-id=492 bgcolor=#d6d6d6
| 106492 ||  || — || November 23, 2000 || Haleakala || NEAT || VER || align=right | 6.7 km || 
|-id=493 bgcolor=#fefefe
| 106493 ||  || — || November 21, 2000 || Socorro || LINEAR || PHO || align=right | 2.4 km || 
|-id=494 bgcolor=#d6d6d6
| 106494 ||  || — || November 20, 2000 || Socorro || LINEAR || — || align=right | 5.7 km || 
|-id=495 bgcolor=#E9E9E9
| 106495 ||  || — || November 20, 2000 || Socorro || LINEAR || — || align=right | 5.3 km || 
|-id=496 bgcolor=#d6d6d6
| 106496 ||  || — || November 20, 2000 || Socorro || LINEAR || — || align=right | 6.8 km || 
|-id=497 bgcolor=#d6d6d6
| 106497 ||  || — || November 20, 2000 || Socorro || LINEAR || — || align=right | 4.9 km || 
|-id=498 bgcolor=#d6d6d6
| 106498 ||  || — || November 20, 2000 || Socorro || LINEAR || — || align=right | 6.0 km || 
|-id=499 bgcolor=#d6d6d6
| 106499 ||  || — || November 20, 2000 || Socorro || LINEAR || — || align=right | 7.8 km || 
|-id=500 bgcolor=#fefefe
| 106500 ||  || — || November 20, 2000 || Socorro || LINEAR || — || align=right | 1.8 km || 
|}

106501–106600 

|-bgcolor=#fefefe
| 106501 ||  || — || November 20, 2000 || Socorro || LINEAR || FLO || align=right | 1.3 km || 
|-id=502 bgcolor=#d6d6d6
| 106502 ||  || — || November 20, 2000 || Socorro || LINEAR || — || align=right | 7.2 km || 
|-id=503 bgcolor=#fefefe
| 106503 ||  || — || November 20, 2000 || Socorro || LINEAR || — || align=right | 2.5 km || 
|-id=504 bgcolor=#d6d6d6
| 106504 ||  || — || November 20, 2000 || Socorro || LINEAR || — || align=right | 5.6 km || 
|-id=505 bgcolor=#fefefe
| 106505 ||  || — || November 20, 2000 || Socorro || LINEAR || — || align=right | 2.1 km || 
|-id=506 bgcolor=#d6d6d6
| 106506 ||  || — || November 20, 2000 || Socorro || LINEAR || — || align=right | 7.1 km || 
|-id=507 bgcolor=#fefefe
| 106507 ||  || — || November 20, 2000 || Socorro || LINEAR || — || align=right | 1.6 km || 
|-id=508 bgcolor=#d6d6d6
| 106508 ||  || — || November 20, 2000 || Socorro || LINEAR || — || align=right | 6.7 km || 
|-id=509 bgcolor=#fefefe
| 106509 ||  || — || November 20, 2000 || Socorro || LINEAR || — || align=right | 1.5 km || 
|-id=510 bgcolor=#fefefe
| 106510 ||  || — || November 20, 2000 || Socorro || LINEAR || V || align=right | 1.4 km || 
|-id=511 bgcolor=#d6d6d6
| 106511 ||  || — || November 21, 2000 || Socorro || LINEAR || — || align=right | 6.7 km || 
|-id=512 bgcolor=#fefefe
| 106512 ||  || — || November 21, 2000 || Socorro || LINEAR || — || align=right | 1.3 km || 
|-id=513 bgcolor=#d6d6d6
| 106513 ||  || — || November 21, 2000 || Socorro || LINEAR || EUP || align=right | 11 km || 
|-id=514 bgcolor=#d6d6d6
| 106514 ||  || — || November 21, 2000 || Socorro || LINEAR || EOS || align=right | 4.2 km || 
|-id=515 bgcolor=#fefefe
| 106515 ||  || — || November 21, 2000 || Socorro || LINEAR || — || align=right | 1.4 km || 
|-id=516 bgcolor=#d6d6d6
| 106516 ||  || — || November 21, 2000 || Socorro || LINEAR || — || align=right | 5.1 km || 
|-id=517 bgcolor=#d6d6d6
| 106517 ||  || — || November 21, 2000 || Socorro || LINEAR || — || align=right | 4.2 km || 
|-id=518 bgcolor=#d6d6d6
| 106518 ||  || — || November 25, 2000 || Socorro || LINEAR || — || align=right | 6.8 km || 
|-id=519 bgcolor=#fefefe
| 106519 ||  || — || November 25, 2000 || Socorro || LINEAR || FLO || align=right | 1.2 km || 
|-id=520 bgcolor=#fefefe
| 106520 ||  || — || November 21, 2000 || Socorro || LINEAR || — || align=right | 2.0 km || 
|-id=521 bgcolor=#FA8072
| 106521 ||  || — || November 26, 2000 || Socorro || LINEAR || — || align=right | 2.5 km || 
|-id=522 bgcolor=#fefefe
| 106522 ||  || — || November 27, 2000 || Kitt Peak || Spacewatch || — || align=right | 1.1 km || 
|-id=523 bgcolor=#fefefe
| 106523 ||  || — || November 20, 2000 || Socorro || LINEAR || PHO || align=right | 3.6 km || 
|-id=524 bgcolor=#fefefe
| 106524 ||  || — || November 20, 2000 || Socorro || LINEAR || V || align=right | 1.6 km || 
|-id=525 bgcolor=#fefefe
| 106525 ||  || — || November 20, 2000 || Socorro || LINEAR || — || align=right | 2.2 km || 
|-id=526 bgcolor=#fefefe
| 106526 ||  || — || November 21, 2000 || Socorro || LINEAR || — || align=right | 1.4 km || 
|-id=527 bgcolor=#d6d6d6
| 106527 ||  || — || November 21, 2000 || Socorro || LINEAR || — || align=right | 8.6 km || 
|-id=528 bgcolor=#d6d6d6
| 106528 ||  || — || November 21, 2000 || Socorro || LINEAR || — || align=right | 3.3 km || 
|-id=529 bgcolor=#fefefe
| 106529 ||  || — || November 21, 2000 || Socorro || LINEAR || — || align=right | 1.8 km || 
|-id=530 bgcolor=#fefefe
| 106530 ||  || — || November 21, 2000 || Socorro || LINEAR || FLO || align=right | 1.3 km || 
|-id=531 bgcolor=#d6d6d6
| 106531 ||  || — || November 21, 2000 || Socorro || LINEAR || — || align=right | 6.2 km || 
|-id=532 bgcolor=#fefefe
| 106532 ||  || — || November 21, 2000 || Socorro || LINEAR || — || align=right | 1.9 km || 
|-id=533 bgcolor=#fefefe
| 106533 ||  || — || November 21, 2000 || Socorro || LINEAR || — || align=right | 2.4 km || 
|-id=534 bgcolor=#fefefe
| 106534 ||  || — || November 21, 2000 || Socorro || LINEAR || — || align=right | 1.4 km || 
|-id=535 bgcolor=#d6d6d6
| 106535 ||  || — || November 28, 2000 || Fountain Hills || C. W. Juels || — || align=right | 9.0 km || 
|-id=536 bgcolor=#d6d6d6
| 106536 ||  || — || November 28, 2000 || Fountain Hills || C. W. Juels || — || align=right | 6.5 km || 
|-id=537 bgcolor=#fefefe
| 106537 McCarthy ||  ||  || November 23, 2000 || Junk Bond || J. Medkeff || V || align=right | 1.2 km || 
|-id=538 bgcolor=#FFC2E0
| 106538 ||  || — || November 26, 2000 || Socorro || LINEAR || APO +1km || align=right | 2.0 km || 
|-id=539 bgcolor=#fefefe
| 106539 ||  || — || November 28, 2000 || Prescott || P. G. Comba || — || align=right | 3.3 km || 
|-id=540 bgcolor=#fefefe
| 106540 ||  || — || November 19, 2000 || Socorro || LINEAR || H || align=right | 1.5 km || 
|-id=541 bgcolor=#fefefe
| 106541 ||  || — || November 19, 2000 || Socorro || LINEAR || H || align=right | 1.4 km || 
|-id=542 bgcolor=#fefefe
| 106542 ||  || — || November 21, 2000 || Socorro || LINEAR || — || align=right | 2.5 km || 
|-id=543 bgcolor=#fefefe
| 106543 ||  || — || November 25, 2000 || Socorro || LINEAR || H || align=right | 1.2 km || 
|-id=544 bgcolor=#fefefe
| 106544 ||  || — || November 27, 2000 || Črni Vrh || Črni Vrh || FLO || align=right | 2.4 km || 
|-id=545 bgcolor=#d6d6d6
| 106545 Colanduno ||  ||  || November 28, 2000 || Junk Bond || J. Medkeff || — || align=right | 5.0 km || 
|-id=546 bgcolor=#E9E9E9
| 106546 ||  || — || November 19, 2000 || Socorro || LINEAR || HNS || align=right | 3.4 km || 
|-id=547 bgcolor=#fefefe
| 106547 ||  || — || November 19, 2000 || Socorro || LINEAR || — || align=right | 2.6 km || 
|-id=548 bgcolor=#d6d6d6
| 106548 ||  || — || November 19, 2000 || Socorro || LINEAR || VER || align=right | 7.4 km || 
|-id=549 bgcolor=#d6d6d6
| 106549 ||  || — || November 19, 2000 || Socorro || LINEAR || EOS || align=right | 4.3 km || 
|-id=550 bgcolor=#d6d6d6
| 106550 ||  || — || November 19, 2000 || Socorro || LINEAR || TIR || align=right | 6.3 km || 
|-id=551 bgcolor=#d6d6d6
| 106551 ||  || — || November 20, 2000 || Socorro || LINEAR || VER || align=right | 5.6 km || 
|-id=552 bgcolor=#d6d6d6
| 106552 ||  || — || November 20, 2000 || Socorro || LINEAR || URS || align=right | 6.9 km || 
|-id=553 bgcolor=#d6d6d6
| 106553 ||  || — || November 20, 2000 || Socorro || LINEAR || EOS || align=right | 4.4 km || 
|-id=554 bgcolor=#fefefe
| 106554 ||  || — || November 20, 2000 || Socorro || LINEAR || — || align=right | 1.4 km || 
|-id=555 bgcolor=#d6d6d6
| 106555 ||  || — || November 20, 2000 || Socorro || LINEAR || EOS || align=right | 3.7 km || 
|-id=556 bgcolor=#d6d6d6
| 106556 ||  || — || November 20, 2000 || Socorro || LINEAR || — || align=right | 6.5 km || 
|-id=557 bgcolor=#fefefe
| 106557 ||  || — || November 20, 2000 || Socorro || LINEAR || — || align=right | 2.2 km || 
|-id=558 bgcolor=#fefefe
| 106558 ||  || — || November 20, 2000 || Socorro || LINEAR || — || align=right | 1.7 km || 
|-id=559 bgcolor=#E9E9E9
| 106559 ||  || — || November 20, 2000 || Socorro || LINEAR || — || align=right | 2.3 km || 
|-id=560 bgcolor=#d6d6d6
| 106560 ||  || — || November 20, 2000 || Socorro || LINEAR || EOS || align=right | 5.1 km || 
|-id=561 bgcolor=#fefefe
| 106561 ||  || — || November 20, 2000 || Socorro || LINEAR || — || align=right | 1.5 km || 
|-id=562 bgcolor=#fefefe
| 106562 ||  || — || November 20, 2000 || Socorro || LINEAR || — || align=right | 1.3 km || 
|-id=563 bgcolor=#d6d6d6
| 106563 ||  || — || November 20, 2000 || Socorro || LINEAR || — || align=right | 3.6 km || 
|-id=564 bgcolor=#fefefe
| 106564 ||  || — || November 20, 2000 || Socorro || LINEAR || FLO || align=right | 1.4 km || 
|-id=565 bgcolor=#E9E9E9
| 106565 ||  || — || November 20, 2000 || Socorro || LINEAR || — || align=right | 3.0 km || 
|-id=566 bgcolor=#fefefe
| 106566 ||  || — || November 20, 2000 || Socorro || LINEAR || — || align=right | 2.2 km || 
|-id=567 bgcolor=#fefefe
| 106567 ||  || — || November 20, 2000 || Socorro || LINEAR || — || align=right | 2.7 km || 
|-id=568 bgcolor=#fefefe
| 106568 ||  || — || November 20, 2000 || Socorro || LINEAR || ERI || align=right | 3.2 km || 
|-id=569 bgcolor=#fefefe
| 106569 ||  || — || November 21, 2000 || Socorro || LINEAR || FLO || align=right | 4.3 km || 
|-id=570 bgcolor=#E9E9E9
| 106570 ||  || — || November 21, 2000 || Socorro || LINEAR || — || align=right | 3.1 km || 
|-id=571 bgcolor=#d6d6d6
| 106571 ||  || — || November 21, 2000 || Socorro || LINEAR || HYG || align=right | 5.9 km || 
|-id=572 bgcolor=#fefefe
| 106572 ||  || — || November 21, 2000 || Socorro || LINEAR || — || align=right | 1.5 km || 
|-id=573 bgcolor=#fefefe
| 106573 ||  || — || November 21, 2000 || Socorro || LINEAR || — || align=right | 4.4 km || 
|-id=574 bgcolor=#fefefe
| 106574 ||  || — || November 21, 2000 || Socorro || LINEAR || MAS || align=right | 1.7 km || 
|-id=575 bgcolor=#d6d6d6
| 106575 ||  || — || November 21, 2000 || Socorro || LINEAR || HYG || align=right | 6.4 km || 
|-id=576 bgcolor=#fefefe
| 106576 ||  || — || November 21, 2000 || Socorro || LINEAR || — || align=right | 1.7 km || 
|-id=577 bgcolor=#FA8072
| 106577 ||  || — || November 21, 2000 || Socorro || LINEAR || — || align=right | 1.5 km || 
|-id=578 bgcolor=#fefefe
| 106578 ||  || — || November 21, 2000 || Socorro || LINEAR || — || align=right | 1.7 km || 
|-id=579 bgcolor=#fefefe
| 106579 ||  || — || November 21, 2000 || Socorro || LINEAR || NYS || align=right | 1.3 km || 
|-id=580 bgcolor=#d6d6d6
| 106580 ||  || — || November 21, 2000 || Socorro || LINEAR || THM || align=right | 5.1 km || 
|-id=581 bgcolor=#fefefe
| 106581 ||  || — || November 21, 2000 || Socorro || LINEAR || V || align=right | 1.4 km || 
|-id=582 bgcolor=#fefefe
| 106582 ||  || — || November 21, 2000 || Socorro || LINEAR || — || align=right | 1.7 km || 
|-id=583 bgcolor=#d6d6d6
| 106583 ||  || — || November 26, 2000 || Socorro || LINEAR || — || align=right | 6.5 km || 
|-id=584 bgcolor=#fefefe
| 106584 ||  || — || November 27, 2000 || Socorro || LINEAR || FLO || align=right | 1.2 km || 
|-id=585 bgcolor=#fefefe
| 106585 ||  || — || November 27, 2000 || Kitt Peak || Spacewatch || NYS || align=right | 1.2 km || 
|-id=586 bgcolor=#fefefe
| 106586 ||  || — || November 27, 2000 || Kitt Peak || Spacewatch || — || align=right | 1.8 km || 
|-id=587 bgcolor=#d6d6d6
| 106587 ||  || — || November 25, 2000 || Haleakala || NEAT || — || align=right | 6.1 km || 
|-id=588 bgcolor=#fefefe
| 106588 ||  || — || November 20, 2000 || Socorro || LINEAR || PHO || align=right | 2.2 km || 
|-id=589 bgcolor=#FFC2E0
| 106589 ||  || — || November 29, 2000 || Haleakala || NEAT || APO +1km || align=right | 2.2 km || 
|-id=590 bgcolor=#d6d6d6
| 106590 ||  || — || November 20, 2000 || Socorro || LINEAR || — || align=right | 5.8 km || 
|-id=591 bgcolor=#fefefe
| 106591 ||  || — || November 20, 2000 || Socorro || LINEAR || — || align=right | 1.6 km || 
|-id=592 bgcolor=#fefefe
| 106592 ||  || — || November 20, 2000 || Socorro || LINEAR || — || align=right | 1.6 km || 
|-id=593 bgcolor=#d6d6d6
| 106593 ||  || — || November 20, 2000 || Socorro || LINEAR || — || align=right | 6.6 km || 
|-id=594 bgcolor=#fefefe
| 106594 ||  || — || November 20, 2000 || Socorro || LINEAR || V || align=right data-sort-value="0.92" | 920 m || 
|-id=595 bgcolor=#d6d6d6
| 106595 ||  || — || November 20, 2000 || Socorro || LINEAR || HYG || align=right | 6.8 km || 
|-id=596 bgcolor=#fefefe
| 106596 ||  || — || November 20, 2000 || Socorro || LINEAR || — || align=right | 1.7 km || 
|-id=597 bgcolor=#E9E9E9
| 106597 ||  || — || November 20, 2000 || Socorro || LINEAR || — || align=right | 2.4 km || 
|-id=598 bgcolor=#fefefe
| 106598 ||  || — || November 20, 2000 || Socorro || LINEAR || — || align=right | 2.3 km || 
|-id=599 bgcolor=#fefefe
| 106599 ||  || — || November 20, 2000 || Socorro || LINEAR || V || align=right | 1.3 km || 
|-id=600 bgcolor=#d6d6d6
| 106600 ||  || — || November 20, 2000 || Socorro || LINEAR || — || align=right | 5.8 km || 
|}

106601–106700 

|-bgcolor=#fefefe
| 106601 ||  || — || November 20, 2000 || Socorro || LINEAR || — || align=right | 1.6 km || 
|-id=602 bgcolor=#fefefe
| 106602 ||  || — || November 20, 2000 || Socorro || LINEAR || — || align=right | 1.8 km || 
|-id=603 bgcolor=#fefefe
| 106603 ||  || — || November 20, 2000 || Socorro || LINEAR || NYS || align=right | 1.4 km || 
|-id=604 bgcolor=#fefefe
| 106604 ||  || — || November 20, 2000 || Socorro || LINEAR || — || align=right | 1.6 km || 
|-id=605 bgcolor=#fefefe
| 106605 ||  || — || November 20, 2000 || Socorro || LINEAR || V || align=right | 1.9 km || 
|-id=606 bgcolor=#fefefe
| 106606 ||  || — || November 20, 2000 || Socorro || LINEAR || — || align=right | 2.1 km || 
|-id=607 bgcolor=#fefefe
| 106607 ||  || — || November 20, 2000 || Socorro || LINEAR || FLO || align=right | 1.5 km || 
|-id=608 bgcolor=#fefefe
| 106608 ||  || — || November 20, 2000 || Socorro || LINEAR || — || align=right | 2.1 km || 
|-id=609 bgcolor=#fefefe
| 106609 ||  || — || November 20, 2000 || Socorro || LINEAR || FLO || align=right | 1.3 km || 
|-id=610 bgcolor=#fefefe
| 106610 ||  || — || November 20, 2000 || Socorro || LINEAR || — || align=right | 1.5 km || 
|-id=611 bgcolor=#fefefe
| 106611 ||  || — || November 20, 2000 || Socorro || LINEAR || — || align=right | 1.7 km || 
|-id=612 bgcolor=#fefefe
| 106612 ||  || — || November 20, 2000 || Socorro || LINEAR || FLO || align=right | 2.0 km || 
|-id=613 bgcolor=#fefefe
| 106613 ||  || — || November 26, 2000 || Socorro || LINEAR || H || align=right data-sort-value="0.95" | 950 m || 
|-id=614 bgcolor=#fefefe
| 106614 ||  || — || November 26, 2000 || Socorro || LINEAR || FLO || align=right | 1.6 km || 
|-id=615 bgcolor=#fefefe
| 106615 ||  || — || November 29, 2000 || Socorro || LINEAR || — || align=right | 1.2 km || 
|-id=616 bgcolor=#fefefe
| 106616 ||  || — || November 29, 2000 || Socorro || LINEAR || — || align=right | 1.3 km || 
|-id=617 bgcolor=#fefefe
| 106617 ||  || — || November 29, 2000 || Socorro || LINEAR || — || align=right | 2.0 km || 
|-id=618 bgcolor=#fefefe
| 106618 ||  || — || November 29, 2000 || Socorro || LINEAR || — || align=right | 2.4 km || 
|-id=619 bgcolor=#E9E9E9
| 106619 ||  || — || November 30, 2000 || Kitt Peak || Spacewatch || — || align=right | 1.9 km || 
|-id=620 bgcolor=#fefefe
| 106620 ||  || — || November 19, 2000 || Socorro || LINEAR || Hslow || align=right | 1.7 km || 
|-id=621 bgcolor=#fefefe
| 106621 ||  || — || November 19, 2000 || Socorro || LINEAR || H || align=right | 1.4 km || 
|-id=622 bgcolor=#fefefe
| 106622 ||  || — || November 19, 2000 || Socorro || LINEAR || H || align=right | 1.8 km || 
|-id=623 bgcolor=#FA8072
| 106623 ||  || — || November 30, 2000 || Socorro || LINEAR || H || align=right | 1.8 km || 
|-id=624 bgcolor=#d6d6d6
| 106624 ||  || — || November 27, 2000 || Haleakala || NEAT || TIR || align=right | 6.4 km || 
|-id=625 bgcolor=#fefefe
| 106625 ||  || — || November 21, 2000 || Socorro || LINEAR || — || align=right | 2.3 km || 
|-id=626 bgcolor=#fefefe
| 106626 ||  || — || November 30, 2000 || Socorro || LINEAR || NYS || align=right | 1.4 km || 
|-id=627 bgcolor=#fefefe
| 106627 ||  || — || November 30, 2000 || Socorro || LINEAR || NYS || align=right | 1.4 km || 
|-id=628 bgcolor=#FA8072
| 106628 ||  || — || November 30, 2000 || Socorro || LINEAR || — || align=right | 2.4 km || 
|-id=629 bgcolor=#d6d6d6
| 106629 ||  || — || November 19, 2000 || Kitt Peak || Spacewatch || HYG || align=right | 6.2 km || 
|-id=630 bgcolor=#E9E9E9
| 106630 ||  || — || November 19, 2000 || Kitt Peak || Spacewatch || — || align=right | 1.7 km || 
|-id=631 bgcolor=#d6d6d6
| 106631 ||  || — || November 20, 2000 || Anderson Mesa || LONEOS || — || align=right | 6.4 km || 
|-id=632 bgcolor=#E9E9E9
| 106632 ||  || — || November 20, 2000 || Anderson Mesa || LONEOS || — || align=right | 1.6 km || 
|-id=633 bgcolor=#E9E9E9
| 106633 ||  || — || November 20, 2000 || Socorro || LINEAR || — || align=right | 3.2 km || 
|-id=634 bgcolor=#d6d6d6
| 106634 ||  || — || November 30, 2000 || Haleakala || NEAT || — || align=right | 7.3 km || 
|-id=635 bgcolor=#E9E9E9
| 106635 ||  || — || November 19, 2000 || Socorro || LINEAR || — || align=right | 2.8 km || 
|-id=636 bgcolor=#d6d6d6
| 106636 ||  || — || November 19, 2000 || Socorro || LINEAR || — || align=right | 7.2 km || 
|-id=637 bgcolor=#d6d6d6
| 106637 ||  || — || November 19, 2000 || Socorro || LINEAR || URS || align=right | 8.7 km || 
|-id=638 bgcolor=#d6d6d6
| 106638 ||  || — || November 19, 2000 || Socorro || LINEAR || — || align=right | 5.0 km || 
|-id=639 bgcolor=#d6d6d6
| 106639 ||  || — || November 19, 2000 || Socorro || LINEAR || — || align=right | 7.1 km || 
|-id=640 bgcolor=#fefefe
| 106640 ||  || — || November 19, 2000 || Socorro || LINEAR || — || align=right | 1.9 km || 
|-id=641 bgcolor=#fefefe
| 106641 ||  || — || November 19, 2000 || Socorro || LINEAR || — || align=right | 1.5 km || 
|-id=642 bgcolor=#d6d6d6
| 106642 ||  || — || November 19, 2000 || Socorro || LINEAR || — || align=right | 5.9 km || 
|-id=643 bgcolor=#d6d6d6
| 106643 ||  || — || November 19, 2000 || Socorro || LINEAR || — || align=right | 3.6 km || 
|-id=644 bgcolor=#d6d6d6
| 106644 ||  || — || November 19, 2000 || Socorro || LINEAR || — || align=right | 5.3 km || 
|-id=645 bgcolor=#d6d6d6
| 106645 ||  || — || November 19, 2000 || Socorro || LINEAR || — || align=right | 5.1 km || 
|-id=646 bgcolor=#fefefe
| 106646 ||  || — || November 19, 2000 || Socorro || LINEAR || V || align=right | 1.3 km || 
|-id=647 bgcolor=#fefefe
| 106647 ||  || — || November 19, 2000 || Socorro || LINEAR || slow? || align=right | 1.8 km || 
|-id=648 bgcolor=#E9E9E9
| 106648 ||  || — || November 20, 2000 || Anderson Mesa || LONEOS || MIT || align=right | 4.9 km || 
|-id=649 bgcolor=#fefefe
| 106649 ||  || — || November 20, 2000 || Socorro || LINEAR || — || align=right | 1.4 km || 
|-id=650 bgcolor=#fefefe
| 106650 ||  || — || November 20, 2000 || Socorro || LINEAR || — || align=right | 1.2 km || 
|-id=651 bgcolor=#fefefe
| 106651 ||  || — || November 20, 2000 || Socorro || LINEAR || FLO || align=right data-sort-value="0.95" | 950 m || 
|-id=652 bgcolor=#d6d6d6
| 106652 ||  || — || November 21, 2000 || Socorro || LINEAR || THM || align=right | 7.4 km || 
|-id=653 bgcolor=#fefefe
| 106653 ||  || — || November 21, 2000 || Socorro || LINEAR || — || align=right | 2.6 km || 
|-id=654 bgcolor=#fefefe
| 106654 ||  || — || November 21, 2000 || Haleakala || NEAT || — || align=right | 1.4 km || 
|-id=655 bgcolor=#d6d6d6
| 106655 ||  || — || November 19, 2000 || Socorro || LINEAR || — || align=right | 10 km || 
|-id=656 bgcolor=#fefefe
| 106656 ||  || — || November 20, 2000 || Anderson Mesa || LONEOS || — || align=right | 2.0 km || 
|-id=657 bgcolor=#d6d6d6
| 106657 ||  || — || November 20, 2000 || Anderson Mesa || LONEOS || — || align=right | 8.0 km || 
|-id=658 bgcolor=#d6d6d6
| 106658 ||  || — || November 20, 2000 || Anderson Mesa || LONEOS || — || align=right | 6.2 km || 
|-id=659 bgcolor=#fefefe
| 106659 ||  || — || November 20, 2000 || Socorro || LINEAR || — || align=right | 3.1 km || 
|-id=660 bgcolor=#fefefe
| 106660 ||  || — || November 20, 2000 || Socorro || LINEAR || NYS || align=right | 1.5 km || 
|-id=661 bgcolor=#d6d6d6
| 106661 ||  || — || November 21, 2000 || Haleakala || NEAT || — || align=right | 6.6 km || 
|-id=662 bgcolor=#d6d6d6
| 106662 ||  || — || November 21, 2000 || Socorro || LINEAR || — || align=right | 5.4 km || 
|-id=663 bgcolor=#fefefe
| 106663 ||  || — || November 21, 2000 || Socorro || LINEAR || NYS || align=right | 1.4 km || 
|-id=664 bgcolor=#d6d6d6
| 106664 ||  || — || November 23, 2000 || Haleakala || NEAT || — || align=right | 6.9 km || 
|-id=665 bgcolor=#d6d6d6
| 106665 ||  || — || November 23, 2000 || Haleakala || NEAT || EOS || align=right | 4.6 km || 
|-id=666 bgcolor=#d6d6d6
| 106666 ||  || — || November 23, 2000 || Haleakala || NEAT || — || align=right | 8.0 km || 
|-id=667 bgcolor=#d6d6d6
| 106667 ||  || — || November 23, 2000 || Haleakala || NEAT || — || align=right | 5.1 km || 
|-id=668 bgcolor=#d6d6d6
| 106668 ||  || — || November 23, 2000 || Haleakala || NEAT || — || align=right | 8.0 km || 
|-id=669 bgcolor=#d6d6d6
| 106669 ||  || — || November 28, 2000 || Haleakala || NEAT || EUP || align=right | 6.9 km || 
|-id=670 bgcolor=#fefefe
| 106670 ||  || — || November 28, 2000 || Kitt Peak || Spacewatch || NYS || align=right data-sort-value="0.97" | 970 m || 
|-id=671 bgcolor=#fefefe
| 106671 ||  || — || November 19, 2000 || Socorro || LINEAR || H || align=right | 1.3 km || 
|-id=672 bgcolor=#fefefe
| 106672 ||  || — || November 30, 2000 || Socorro || LINEAR || H || align=right | 1.7 km || 
|-id=673 bgcolor=#fefefe
| 106673 ||  || — || November 30, 2000 || Socorro || LINEAR || H || align=right | 1.6 km || 
|-id=674 bgcolor=#d6d6d6
| 106674 ||  || — || November 30, 2000 || Haleakala || NEAT || EOS || align=right | 4.9 km || 
|-id=675 bgcolor=#d6d6d6
| 106675 ||  || — || November 30, 2000 || Haleakala || NEAT || — || align=right | 6.8 km || 
|-id=676 bgcolor=#d6d6d6
| 106676 ||  || — || November 29, 2000 || Socorro || LINEAR || EUP || align=right | 10 km || 
|-id=677 bgcolor=#d6d6d6
| 106677 ||  || — || November 29, 2000 || Socorro || LINEAR || — || align=right | 6.3 km || 
|-id=678 bgcolor=#d6d6d6
| 106678 ||  || — || November 29, 2000 || Socorro || LINEAR || EMA || align=right | 7.3 km || 
|-id=679 bgcolor=#fefefe
| 106679 ||  || — || November 29, 2000 || Socorro || LINEAR || FLO || align=right | 1.3 km || 
|-id=680 bgcolor=#fefefe
| 106680 ||  || — || November 29, 2000 || Socorro || LINEAR || FLO || align=right | 1.5 km || 
|-id=681 bgcolor=#fefefe
| 106681 ||  || — || November 29, 2000 || Socorro || LINEAR || — || align=right | 2.7 km || 
|-id=682 bgcolor=#d6d6d6
| 106682 ||  || — || November 30, 2000 || Socorro || LINEAR || EOS || align=right | 5.0 km || 
|-id=683 bgcolor=#d6d6d6
| 106683 ||  || — || November 30, 2000 || Socorro || LINEAR || — || align=right | 4.1 km || 
|-id=684 bgcolor=#d6d6d6
| 106684 ||  || — || November 30, 2000 || Socorro || LINEAR || — || align=right | 8.2 km || 
|-id=685 bgcolor=#d6d6d6
| 106685 ||  || — || November 30, 2000 || Socorro || LINEAR || — || align=right | 7.8 km || 
|-id=686 bgcolor=#fefefe
| 106686 ||  || — || November 30, 2000 || Socorro || LINEAR || — || align=right | 1.7 km || 
|-id=687 bgcolor=#E9E9E9
| 106687 ||  || — || November 30, 2000 || Socorro || LINEAR || — || align=right | 4.7 km || 
|-id=688 bgcolor=#fefefe
| 106688 ||  || — || November 30, 2000 || Socorro || LINEAR || — || align=right | 2.4 km || 
|-id=689 bgcolor=#fefefe
| 106689 ||  || — || November 30, 2000 || Socorro || LINEAR || — || align=right | 2.2 km || 
|-id=690 bgcolor=#fefefe
| 106690 ||  || — || November 30, 2000 || Socorro || LINEAR || FLO || align=right | 1.5 km || 
|-id=691 bgcolor=#d6d6d6
| 106691 ||  || — || November 30, 2000 || Haleakala || NEAT || — || align=right | 8.0 km || 
|-id=692 bgcolor=#fefefe
| 106692 ||  || — || November 30, 2000 || Kitt Peak || Spacewatch || — || align=right | 1.5 km || 
|-id=693 bgcolor=#d6d6d6
| 106693 ||  || — || November 20, 2000 || Anderson Mesa || LONEOS || — || align=right | 3.9 km || 
|-id=694 bgcolor=#d6d6d6
| 106694 ||  || — || November 20, 2000 || Anderson Mesa || LONEOS || EOS || align=right | 6.3 km || 
|-id=695 bgcolor=#d6d6d6
| 106695 ||  || — || November 22, 2000 || Haleakala || NEAT || — || align=right | 6.7 km || 
|-id=696 bgcolor=#d6d6d6
| 106696 ||  || — || November 22, 2000 || Haleakala || NEAT || EOS || align=right | 3.5 km || 
|-id=697 bgcolor=#E9E9E9
| 106697 ||  || — || November 22, 2000 || Haleakala || NEAT || — || align=right | 3.7 km || 
|-id=698 bgcolor=#fefefe
| 106698 ||  || — || November 24, 2000 || Anderson Mesa || LONEOS || — || align=right | 1.5 km || 
|-id=699 bgcolor=#d6d6d6
| 106699 ||  || — || November 24, 2000 || Anderson Mesa || LONEOS || — || align=right | 7.2 km || 
|-id=700 bgcolor=#fefefe
| 106700 ||  || — || November 24, 2000 || Anderson Mesa || LONEOS || H || align=right | 1.4 km || 
|}

106701–106800 

|-bgcolor=#d6d6d6
| 106701 ||  || — || November 25, 2000 || Socorro || LINEAR || — || align=right | 4.7 km || 
|-id=702 bgcolor=#d6d6d6
| 106702 ||  || — || November 25, 2000 || Socorro || LINEAR || — || align=right | 5.6 km || 
|-id=703 bgcolor=#d6d6d6
| 106703 ||  || — || November 25, 2000 || Socorro || LINEAR || — || align=right | 5.8 km || 
|-id=704 bgcolor=#fefefe
| 106704 ||  || — || November 25, 2000 || Anderson Mesa || LONEOS || — || align=right | 2.2 km || 
|-id=705 bgcolor=#fefefe
| 106705 ||  || — || November 25, 2000 || Anderson Mesa || LONEOS || — || align=right | 2.1 km || 
|-id=706 bgcolor=#d6d6d6
| 106706 ||  || — || November 26, 2000 || Socorro || LINEAR || — || align=right | 8.4 km || 
|-id=707 bgcolor=#d6d6d6
| 106707 ||  || — || November 24, 2000 || Anderson Mesa || LONEOS || HYG || align=right | 6.9 km || 
|-id=708 bgcolor=#d6d6d6
| 106708 ||  || — || November 24, 2000 || Anderson Mesa || LONEOS || EOS || align=right | 3.6 km || 
|-id=709 bgcolor=#E9E9E9
| 106709 ||  || — || November 24, 2000 || Kitt Peak || Spacewatch || — || align=right | 4.1 km || 
|-id=710 bgcolor=#d6d6d6
| 106710 ||  || — || November 25, 2000 || Socorro || LINEAR || — || align=right | 6.1 km || 
|-id=711 bgcolor=#fefefe
| 106711 ||  || — || November 25, 2000 || Anderson Mesa || LONEOS || — || align=right | 2.3 km || 
|-id=712 bgcolor=#fefefe
| 106712 ||  || — || November 25, 2000 || Anderson Mesa || LONEOS || — || align=right | 1.5 km || 
|-id=713 bgcolor=#d6d6d6
| 106713 ||  || — || November 26, 2000 || Socorro || LINEAR || — || align=right | 5.2 km || 
|-id=714 bgcolor=#d6d6d6
| 106714 ||  || — || November 26, 2000 || Anderson Mesa || LONEOS || URS || align=right | 6.0 km || 
|-id=715 bgcolor=#d6d6d6
| 106715 ||  || — || November 26, 2000 || Socorro || LINEAR || VER || align=right | 6.8 km || 
|-id=716 bgcolor=#d6d6d6
| 106716 ||  || — || November 26, 2000 || Socorro || LINEAR || — || align=right | 7.9 km || 
|-id=717 bgcolor=#E9E9E9
| 106717 ||  || — || November 26, 2000 || Socorro || LINEAR || — || align=right | 5.1 km || 
|-id=718 bgcolor=#d6d6d6
| 106718 ||  || — || November 26, 2000 || Socorro || LINEAR || — || align=right | 6.2 km || 
|-id=719 bgcolor=#d6d6d6
| 106719 ||  || — || November 26, 2000 || Socorro || LINEAR || TIR || align=right | 7.1 km || 
|-id=720 bgcolor=#d6d6d6
| 106720 ||  || — || November 26, 2000 || Socorro || LINEAR || ALA || align=right | 6.8 km || 
|-id=721 bgcolor=#d6d6d6
| 106721 ||  || — || November 27, 2000 || Socorro || LINEAR || — || align=right | 6.9 km || 
|-id=722 bgcolor=#d6d6d6
| 106722 ||  || — || November 25, 2000 || Socorro || LINEAR || — || align=right | 8.9 km || 
|-id=723 bgcolor=#d6d6d6
| 106723 ||  || — || November 26, 2000 || Socorro || LINEAR || slow || align=right | 5.5 km || 
|-id=724 bgcolor=#fefefe
| 106724 ||  || — || November 26, 2000 || Socorro || LINEAR || — || align=right | 4.1 km || 
|-id=725 bgcolor=#d6d6d6
| 106725 ||  || — || November 27, 2000 || Socorro || LINEAR || EOS || align=right | 3.5 km || 
|-id=726 bgcolor=#d6d6d6
| 106726 ||  || — || November 28, 2000 || Kitt Peak || Spacewatch || EOS || align=right | 4.4 km || 
|-id=727 bgcolor=#fefefe
| 106727 ||  || — || November 25, 2000 || Anderson Mesa || LONEOS || PHO || align=right | 1.7 km || 
|-id=728 bgcolor=#d6d6d6
| 106728 ||  || — || November 20, 2000 || Anderson Mesa || LONEOS || — || align=right | 7.1 km || 
|-id=729 bgcolor=#E9E9E9
| 106729 ||  || — || November 20, 2000 || Anderson Mesa || LONEOS || — || align=right | 3.3 km || 
|-id=730 bgcolor=#d6d6d6
| 106730 ||  || — || November 17, 2000 || Socorro || LINEAR || TIR || align=right | 6.2 km || 
|-id=731 bgcolor=#d6d6d6
| 106731 ||  || — || November 30, 2000 || Anderson Mesa || LONEOS || URS || align=right | 7.1 km || 
|-id=732 bgcolor=#E9E9E9
| 106732 ||  || — || November 30, 2000 || Anderson Mesa || LONEOS || — || align=right | 2.7 km || 
|-id=733 bgcolor=#fefefe
| 106733 ||  || — || November 30, 2000 || Kitt Peak || Spacewatch || NYS || align=right | 3.0 km || 
|-id=734 bgcolor=#fefefe
| 106734 ||  || — || November 30, 2000 || Kitt Peak || Spacewatch || — || align=right | 1.5 km || 
|-id=735 bgcolor=#fefefe
| 106735 ||  || — || November 29, 2000 || Socorro || LINEAR || — || align=right | 1.6 km || 
|-id=736 bgcolor=#fefefe
| 106736 ||  || — || November 29, 2000 || Socorro || LINEAR || — || align=right | 2.3 km || 
|-id=737 bgcolor=#fefefe
| 106737 ||  || — || November 27, 2000 || Socorro || LINEAR || — || align=right | 3.0 km || 
|-id=738 bgcolor=#d6d6d6
| 106738 ||  || — || November 19, 2000 || Anderson Mesa || LONEOS || HYG || align=right | 5.7 km || 
|-id=739 bgcolor=#fefefe
| 106739 ||  || — || November 16, 2000 || Anderson Mesa || LONEOS || — || align=right | 3.8 km || 
|-id=740 bgcolor=#d6d6d6
| 106740 ||  || — || November 18, 2000 || Anderson Mesa || LONEOS || — || align=right | 4.4 km || 
|-id=741 bgcolor=#d6d6d6
| 106741 ||  || — || November 18, 2000 || Anderson Mesa || LONEOS || VER || align=right | 7.6 km || 
|-id=742 bgcolor=#E9E9E9
| 106742 ||  || — || November 18, 2000 || Anderson Mesa || LONEOS || — || align=right | 2.0 km || 
|-id=743 bgcolor=#d6d6d6
| 106743 ||  || — || November 18, 2000 || Anderson Mesa || LONEOS || HYG || align=right | 5.7 km || 
|-id=744 bgcolor=#fefefe
| 106744 ||  || — || November 18, 2000 || Anderson Mesa || LONEOS || — || align=right | 2.0 km || 
|-id=745 bgcolor=#d6d6d6
| 106745 ||  || — || November 19, 2000 || Anderson Mesa || LONEOS || — || align=right | 4.5 km || 
|-id=746 bgcolor=#E9E9E9
| 106746 ||  || — || November 19, 2000 || Anderson Mesa || LONEOS || — || align=right | 2.2 km || 
|-id=747 bgcolor=#fefefe
| 106747 ||  || — || December 1, 2000 || Socorro || LINEAR || — || align=right | 2.1 km || 
|-id=748 bgcolor=#fefefe
| 106748 ||  || — || December 3, 2000 || Olathe || L. Robinson || V || align=right | 1.4 km || 
|-id=749 bgcolor=#d6d6d6
| 106749 ||  || — || December 1, 2000 || Socorro || LINEAR || URS || align=right | 4.5 km || 
|-id=750 bgcolor=#d6d6d6
| 106750 ||  || — || December 1, 2000 || Socorro || LINEAR || — || align=right | 8.2 km || 
|-id=751 bgcolor=#d6d6d6
| 106751 ||  || — || December 1, 2000 || Socorro || LINEAR || — || align=right | 4.7 km || 
|-id=752 bgcolor=#d6d6d6
| 106752 ||  || — || December 1, 2000 || Socorro || LINEAR || — || align=right | 8.6 km || 
|-id=753 bgcolor=#d6d6d6
| 106753 ||  || — || December 1, 2000 || Socorro || LINEAR || — || align=right | 5.5 km || 
|-id=754 bgcolor=#d6d6d6
| 106754 ||  || — || December 1, 2000 || Socorro || LINEAR || — || align=right | 6.6 km || 
|-id=755 bgcolor=#d6d6d6
| 106755 ||  || — || December 1, 2000 || Socorro || LINEAR || — || align=right | 4.6 km || 
|-id=756 bgcolor=#d6d6d6
| 106756 ||  || — || December 1, 2000 || Socorro || LINEAR || EOS || align=right | 4.6 km || 
|-id=757 bgcolor=#d6d6d6
| 106757 ||  || — || December 1, 2000 || Socorro || LINEAR || — || align=right | 9.1 km || 
|-id=758 bgcolor=#fefefe
| 106758 ||  || — || December 1, 2000 || Socorro || LINEAR || — || align=right | 1.8 km || 
|-id=759 bgcolor=#d6d6d6
| 106759 ||  || — || December 1, 2000 || Socorro || LINEAR || — || align=right | 9.7 km || 
|-id=760 bgcolor=#fefefe
| 106760 ||  || — || December 1, 2000 || Socorro || LINEAR || FLO || align=right | 1.1 km || 
|-id=761 bgcolor=#fefefe
| 106761 ||  || — || December 1, 2000 || Socorro || LINEAR || H || align=right | 1.9 km || 
|-id=762 bgcolor=#fefefe
| 106762 ||  || — || December 1, 2000 || Socorro || LINEAR || — || align=right | 7.3 km || 
|-id=763 bgcolor=#E9E9E9
| 106763 ||  || — || December 1, 2000 || Socorro || LINEAR || EUN || align=right | 2.6 km || 
|-id=764 bgcolor=#d6d6d6
| 106764 ||  || — || December 1, 2000 || Socorro || LINEAR || — || align=right | 8.5 km || 
|-id=765 bgcolor=#d6d6d6
| 106765 ||  || — || December 4, 2000 || Socorro || LINEAR || — || align=right | 5.9 km || 
|-id=766 bgcolor=#fefefe
| 106766 ||  || — || December 4, 2000 || Socorro || LINEAR || — || align=right | 1.8 km || 
|-id=767 bgcolor=#fefefe
| 106767 ||  || — || December 4, 2000 || Socorro || LINEAR || PHO || align=right | 7.6 km || 
|-id=768 bgcolor=#E9E9E9
| 106768 ||  || — || December 1, 2000 || Haleakala || NEAT || BAR || align=right | 3.4 km || 
|-id=769 bgcolor=#fefefe
| 106769 ||  || — || December 5, 2000 || Socorro || LINEAR || H || align=right | 2.5 km || 
|-id=770 bgcolor=#fefefe
| 106770 ||  || — || December 5, 2000 || Socorro || LINEAR || H || align=right | 1.2 km || 
|-id=771 bgcolor=#d6d6d6
| 106771 ||  || — || December 5, 2000 || Socorro || LINEAR || Tj (2.97) || align=right | 9.0 km || 
|-id=772 bgcolor=#d6d6d6
| 106772 ||  || — || December 1, 2000 || Socorro || LINEAR || — || align=right | 8.0 km || 
|-id=773 bgcolor=#d6d6d6
| 106773 ||  || — || December 1, 2000 || Socorro || LINEAR || — || align=right | 8.3 km || 
|-id=774 bgcolor=#d6d6d6
| 106774 ||  || — || December 1, 2000 || Socorro || LINEAR || — || align=right | 3.6 km || 
|-id=775 bgcolor=#fefefe
| 106775 ||  || — || December 1, 2000 || Socorro || LINEAR || LCI || align=right | 3.3 km || 
|-id=776 bgcolor=#d6d6d6
| 106776 ||  || — || December 4, 2000 || Socorro || LINEAR || — || align=right | 8.4 km || 
|-id=777 bgcolor=#d6d6d6
| 106777 ||  || — || December 4, 2000 || Socorro || LINEAR || EOS || align=right | 4.1 km || 
|-id=778 bgcolor=#d6d6d6
| 106778 ||  || — || December 4, 2000 || Socorro || LINEAR || EOS || align=right | 4.1 km || 
|-id=779 bgcolor=#fefefe
| 106779 ||  || — || December 4, 2000 || Socorro || LINEAR || V || align=right | 1.3 km || 
|-id=780 bgcolor=#d6d6d6
| 106780 ||  || — || December 4, 2000 || Socorro || LINEAR || — || align=right | 9.3 km || 
|-id=781 bgcolor=#d6d6d6
| 106781 ||  || — || December 4, 2000 || Socorro || LINEAR || TIR || align=right | 4.5 km || 
|-id=782 bgcolor=#fefefe
| 106782 ||  || — || December 4, 2000 || Socorro || LINEAR || V || align=right | 1.3 km || 
|-id=783 bgcolor=#d6d6d6
| 106783 ||  || — || December 4, 2000 || Socorro || LINEAR || EMA || align=right | 7.8 km || 
|-id=784 bgcolor=#fefefe
| 106784 ||  || — || December 4, 2000 || Socorro || LINEAR || — || align=right | 1.8 km || 
|-id=785 bgcolor=#d6d6d6
| 106785 ||  || — || December 4, 2000 || Socorro || LINEAR || — || align=right | 7.8 km || 
|-id=786 bgcolor=#d6d6d6
| 106786 ||  || — || December 4, 2000 || Socorro || LINEAR || — || align=right | 9.0 km || 
|-id=787 bgcolor=#fefefe
| 106787 ||  || — || December 4, 2000 || Socorro || LINEAR || FLO || align=right | 1.1 km || 
|-id=788 bgcolor=#fefefe
| 106788 ||  || — || December 4, 2000 || Socorro || LINEAR || — || align=right | 2.2 km || 
|-id=789 bgcolor=#E9E9E9
| 106789 ||  || — || December 4, 2000 || Socorro || LINEAR || — || align=right | 4.6 km || 
|-id=790 bgcolor=#fefefe
| 106790 ||  || — || December 4, 2000 || Socorro || LINEAR || FLO || align=right | 1.2 km || 
|-id=791 bgcolor=#d6d6d6
| 106791 ||  || — || December 4, 2000 || Socorro || LINEAR || — || align=right | 6.6 km || 
|-id=792 bgcolor=#d6d6d6
| 106792 ||  || — || December 4, 2000 || Socorro || LINEAR || — || align=right | 6.7 km || 
|-id=793 bgcolor=#d6d6d6
| 106793 ||  || — || December 4, 2000 || Socorro || LINEAR || — || align=right | 5.3 km || 
|-id=794 bgcolor=#fefefe
| 106794 ||  || — || December 4, 2000 || Socorro || LINEAR || ERI || align=right | 3.8 km || 
|-id=795 bgcolor=#fefefe
| 106795 ||  || — || December 4, 2000 || Socorro || LINEAR || — || align=right | 1.8 km || 
|-id=796 bgcolor=#fefefe
| 106796 ||  || — || December 4, 2000 || Socorro || LINEAR || FLO || align=right | 1.2 km || 
|-id=797 bgcolor=#fefefe
| 106797 ||  || — || December 4, 2000 || Socorro || LINEAR || KLI || align=right | 4.0 km || 
|-id=798 bgcolor=#fefefe
| 106798 ||  || — || December 4, 2000 || Socorro || LINEAR || — || align=right | 1.4 km || 
|-id=799 bgcolor=#d6d6d6
| 106799 ||  || — || December 4, 2000 || Socorro || LINEAR || EOS || align=right | 4.3 km || 
|-id=800 bgcolor=#d6d6d6
| 106800 ||  || — || December 4, 2000 || Socorro || LINEAR || ALA || align=right | 7.3 km || 
|}

106801–106900 

|-bgcolor=#d6d6d6
| 106801 ||  || — || December 4, 2000 || Socorro || LINEAR || — || align=right | 7.2 km || 
|-id=802 bgcolor=#fefefe
| 106802 ||  || — || December 4, 2000 || Socorro || LINEAR || — || align=right | 4.6 km || 
|-id=803 bgcolor=#fefefe
| 106803 ||  || — || December 4, 2000 || Socorro || LINEAR || — || align=right | 2.4 km || 
|-id=804 bgcolor=#fefefe
| 106804 ||  || — || December 4, 2000 || Socorro || LINEAR || — || align=right | 1.7 km || 
|-id=805 bgcolor=#E9E9E9
| 106805 ||  || — || December 4, 2000 || Socorro || LINEAR || — || align=right | 2.7 km || 
|-id=806 bgcolor=#E9E9E9
| 106806 ||  || — || December 4, 2000 || Socorro || LINEAR || — || align=right | 4.7 km || 
|-id=807 bgcolor=#d6d6d6
| 106807 ||  || — || December 5, 2000 || Socorro || LINEAR || MEL || align=right | 8.0 km || 
|-id=808 bgcolor=#fefefe
| 106808 ||  || — || December 5, 2000 || Socorro || LINEAR || H || align=right | 1.3 km || 
|-id=809 bgcolor=#d6d6d6
| 106809 ||  || — || December 4, 2000 || Socorro || LINEAR || — || align=right | 4.0 km || 
|-id=810 bgcolor=#E9E9E9
| 106810 ||  || — || December 5, 2000 || Socorro || LINEAR || MAR || align=right | 4.2 km || 
|-id=811 bgcolor=#d6d6d6
| 106811 ||  || — || December 5, 2000 || Socorro || LINEAR || — || align=right | 6.7 km || 
|-id=812 bgcolor=#d6d6d6
| 106812 ||  || — || December 5, 2000 || Socorro || LINEAR || TIR || align=right | 8.2 km || 
|-id=813 bgcolor=#d6d6d6
| 106813 ||  || — || December 5, 2000 || Socorro || LINEAR || — || align=right | 4.4 km || 
|-id=814 bgcolor=#d6d6d6
| 106814 ||  || — || December 5, 2000 || Socorro || LINEAR || TIR || align=right | 4.4 km || 
|-id=815 bgcolor=#fefefe
| 106815 ||  || — || December 5, 2000 || Socorro || LINEAR || H || align=right | 1.0 km || 
|-id=816 bgcolor=#d6d6d6
| 106816 ||  || — || December 5, 2000 || Socorro || LINEAR || TIR || align=right | 4.5 km || 
|-id=817 bgcolor=#d6d6d6
| 106817 Yubangtaek ||  ||  || December 6, 2000 || Bohyunsan || Y.-B. Jeon, Y.-H. Park || — || align=right | 4.2 km || 
|-id=818 bgcolor=#d6d6d6
| 106818 ||  || — || December 8, 2000 || Socorro || LINEAR || EUP || align=right | 12 km || 
|-id=819 bgcolor=#fefefe
| 106819 ||  || — || December 5, 2000 || Socorro || LINEAR || H || align=right | 1.6 km || 
|-id=820 bgcolor=#fefefe
| 106820 ||  || — || December 7, 2000 || Socorro || LINEAR || H || align=right | 1.2 km || 
|-id=821 bgcolor=#fefefe
| 106821 ||  || — || December 15, 2000 || Socorro || LINEAR || H || align=right | 1.3 km || 
|-id=822 bgcolor=#d6d6d6
| 106822 ||  || — || December 4, 2000 || Socorro || LINEAR || — || align=right | 6.0 km || 
|-id=823 bgcolor=#E9E9E9
| 106823 ||  || — || December 4, 2000 || Socorro || LINEAR || — || align=right | 3.3 km || 
|-id=824 bgcolor=#d6d6d6
| 106824 ||  || — || December 6, 2000 || Socorro || LINEAR || — || align=right | 7.2 km || 
|-id=825 bgcolor=#fefefe
| 106825 ||  || — || December 15, 2000 || Uccle || T. Pauwels || MAS || align=right | 1.8 km || 
|-id=826 bgcolor=#fefefe
| 106826 || 2000 YF || — || December 16, 2000 || Socorro || LINEAR || H || align=right | 1.4 km || 
|-id=827 bgcolor=#d6d6d6
| 106827 || 2000 YU || — || December 16, 2000 || Socorro || LINEAR || TIR || align=right | 3.3 km || 
|-id=828 bgcolor=#fefefe
| 106828 ||  || — || December 18, 2000 || Kitt Peak || Spacewatch || — || align=right | 1.9 km || 
|-id=829 bgcolor=#fefefe
| 106829 ||  || — || December 17, 2000 || Socorro || LINEAR || H || align=right | 1.3 km || 
|-id=830 bgcolor=#fefefe
| 106830 ||  || — || December 19, 2000 || Višnjan Observatory || K. Korlević || — || align=right | 1.6 km || 
|-id=831 bgcolor=#d6d6d6
| 106831 ||  || — || December 20, 2000 || Kitt Peak || Spacewatch || THM || align=right | 3.0 km || 
|-id=832 bgcolor=#E9E9E9
| 106832 ||  || — || December 20, 2000 || Socorro || LINEAR || — || align=right | 3.1 km || 
|-id=833 bgcolor=#fefefe
| 106833 ||  || — || December 20, 2000 || Socorro || LINEAR || NYS || align=right | 1.6 km || 
|-id=834 bgcolor=#fefefe
| 106834 ||  || — || December 20, 2000 || Socorro || LINEAR || — || align=right | 1.8 km || 
|-id=835 bgcolor=#fefefe
| 106835 ||  || — || December 22, 2000 || Višnjan Observatory || K. Korlević || NYS || align=right | 2.0 km || 
|-id=836 bgcolor=#fefefe
| 106836 ||  || — || December 20, 2000 || Oaxaca || J. M. Roe || MAS || align=right | 1.5 km || 
|-id=837 bgcolor=#fefefe
| 106837 ||  || — || December 20, 2000 || Kitt Peak || Spacewatch || FLO || align=right | 1.2 km || 
|-id=838 bgcolor=#fefefe
| 106838 ||  || — || December 23, 2000 || Višnjan Observatory || K. Korlević || V || align=right | 1.6 km || 
|-id=839 bgcolor=#fefefe
| 106839 ||  || — || December 21, 2000 || Socorro || LINEAR || NYS || align=right | 1.5 km || 
|-id=840 bgcolor=#E9E9E9
| 106840 ||  || — || December 22, 2000 || Socorro || LINEAR || KRM || align=right | 5.0 km || 
|-id=841 bgcolor=#E9E9E9
| 106841 ||  || — || December 22, 2000 || Socorro || LINEAR || MAR || align=right | 2.5 km || 
|-id=842 bgcolor=#fefefe
| 106842 ||  || — || December 23, 2000 || Desert Beaver || W. K. Y. Yeung || V || align=right | 2.1 km || 
|-id=843 bgcolor=#fefefe
| 106843 ||  || — || December 25, 2000 || Oizumi || T. Kobayashi || — || align=right | 1.7 km || 
|-id=844 bgcolor=#fefefe
| 106844 ||  || — || December 25, 2000 || Oaxaca || J. M. Roe || NYS || align=right | 1.1 km || 
|-id=845 bgcolor=#fefefe
| 106845 ||  || — || December 24, 2000 || Farpoint || G. Hug || — || align=right | 2.0 km || 
|-id=846 bgcolor=#E9E9E9
| 106846 ||  || — || December 22, 2000 || Anderson Mesa || LONEOS || — || align=right | 2.2 km || 
|-id=847 bgcolor=#E9E9E9
| 106847 ||  || — || December 28, 2000 || Ametlla de Mar || J. Nomen || — || align=right | 5.4 km || 
|-id=848 bgcolor=#FA8072
| 106848 ||  || — || December 28, 2000 || Socorro || LINEAR || — || align=right | 1.3 km || 
|-id=849 bgcolor=#fefefe
| 106849 ||  || — || December 22, 2000 || Socorro || LINEAR || H || align=right | 1.3 km || 
|-id=850 bgcolor=#E9E9E9
| 106850 ||  || — || December 21, 2000 || Socorro || LINEAR || MIT || align=right | 5.5 km || 
|-id=851 bgcolor=#E9E9E9
| 106851 ||  || — || December 28, 2000 || Fair Oaks Ranch || J. V. McClusky || HNS || align=right | 2.1 km || 
|-id=852 bgcolor=#d6d6d6
| 106852 ||  || — || December 22, 2000 || Haleakala || NEAT || MEL || align=right | 5.9 km || 
|-id=853 bgcolor=#fefefe
| 106853 ||  || — || December 27, 2000 || Desert Beaver || W. K. Y. Yeung || — || align=right | 1.9 km || 
|-id=854 bgcolor=#fefefe
| 106854 ||  || — || December 28, 2000 || Kitt Peak || Spacewatch || — || align=right | 1.9 km || 
|-id=855 bgcolor=#E9E9E9
| 106855 ||  || — || December 26, 2000 || Haleakala || NEAT || EUN || align=right | 2.2 km || 
|-id=856 bgcolor=#fefefe
| 106856 ||  || — || December 26, 2000 || Kitt Peak || Spacewatch || — || align=right | 1.3 km || 
|-id=857 bgcolor=#fefefe
| 106857 ||  || — || December 28, 2000 || Kitt Peak || Spacewatch || V || align=right | 1.4 km || 
|-id=858 bgcolor=#fefefe
| 106858 ||  || — || December 28, 2000 || Kitt Peak || Spacewatch || — || align=right | 1.8 km || 
|-id=859 bgcolor=#d6d6d6
| 106859 ||  || — || December 23, 2000 || Socorro || LINEAR || — || align=right | 6.0 km || 
|-id=860 bgcolor=#d6d6d6
| 106860 ||  || — || December 28, 2000 || Socorro || LINEAR || — || align=right | 6.9 km || 
|-id=861 bgcolor=#E9E9E9
| 106861 ||  || — || December 28, 2000 || Socorro || LINEAR || — || align=right | 2.4 km || 
|-id=862 bgcolor=#fefefe
| 106862 ||  || — || December 25, 2000 || Haleakala || NEAT || — || align=right | 2.0 km || 
|-id=863 bgcolor=#E9E9E9
| 106863 ||  || — || December 25, 2000 || Haleakala || NEAT || — || align=right | 2.2 km || 
|-id=864 bgcolor=#fefefe
| 106864 ||  || — || December 30, 2000 || Kitt Peak || Spacewatch || — || align=right | 1.6 km || 
|-id=865 bgcolor=#fefefe
| 106865 ||  || — || December 30, 2000 || Kitt Peak || Spacewatch || NYS || align=right | 1.2 km || 
|-id=866 bgcolor=#fefefe
| 106866 ||  || — || December 28, 2000 || Socorro || LINEAR || H || align=right | 1.2 km || 
|-id=867 bgcolor=#fefefe
| 106867 ||  || — || December 28, 2000 || Socorro || LINEAR || H || align=right | 1.1 km || 
|-id=868 bgcolor=#fefefe
| 106868 ||  || — || December 31, 2000 || Kitt Peak || Spacewatch || — || align=right | 1.9 km || 
|-id=869 bgcolor=#fefefe
| 106869 Irinyi ||  ||  || December 31, 2000 || Piszkéstető || K. Sárneczky, L. Kiss || — || align=right | 1.5 km || 
|-id=870 bgcolor=#fefefe
| 106870 ||  || — || December 30, 2000 || Socorro || LINEAR || — || align=right | 1.8 km || 
|-id=871 bgcolor=#fefefe
| 106871 ||  || — || December 30, 2000 || Socorro || LINEAR || PHO || align=right | 2.0 km || 
|-id=872 bgcolor=#fefefe
| 106872 ||  || — || December 30, 2000 || Socorro || LINEAR || — || align=right | 2.1 km || 
|-id=873 bgcolor=#fefefe
| 106873 ||  || — || December 30, 2000 || Socorro || LINEAR || — || align=right | 4.1 km || 
|-id=874 bgcolor=#d6d6d6
| 106874 ||  || — || December 23, 2000 || Črni Vrh || Črni Vrh || — || align=right | 6.1 km || 
|-id=875 bgcolor=#E9E9E9
| 106875 ||  || — || December 28, 2000 || Socorro || LINEAR || — || align=right | 2.5 km || 
|-id=876 bgcolor=#E9E9E9
| 106876 ||  || — || December 28, 2000 || Socorro || LINEAR || — || align=right | 2.7 km || 
|-id=877 bgcolor=#fefefe
| 106877 ||  || — || December 28, 2000 || Socorro || LINEAR || NYS || align=right | 2.0 km || 
|-id=878 bgcolor=#fefefe
| 106878 ||  || — || December 30, 2000 || Socorro || LINEAR || — || align=right | 1.8 km || 
|-id=879 bgcolor=#fefefe
| 106879 ||  || — || December 30, 2000 || Socorro || LINEAR || — || align=right | 1.5 km || 
|-id=880 bgcolor=#d6d6d6
| 106880 ||  || — || December 30, 2000 || Socorro || LINEAR || THB || align=right | 6.1 km || 
|-id=881 bgcolor=#fefefe
| 106881 ||  || — || December 30, 2000 || Socorro || LINEAR || — || align=right | 1.5 km || 
|-id=882 bgcolor=#fefefe
| 106882 ||  || — || December 30, 2000 || Socorro || LINEAR || FLO || align=right | 2.2 km || 
|-id=883 bgcolor=#E9E9E9
| 106883 ||  || — || December 30, 2000 || Socorro || LINEAR || — || align=right | 2.2 km || 
|-id=884 bgcolor=#fefefe
| 106884 ||  || — || December 30, 2000 || Socorro || LINEAR || NYS || align=right | 1.4 km || 
|-id=885 bgcolor=#E9E9E9
| 106885 ||  || — || December 30, 2000 || Socorro || LINEAR || — || align=right | 2.1 km || 
|-id=886 bgcolor=#d6d6d6
| 106886 ||  || — || December 30, 2000 || Socorro || LINEAR || — || align=right | 7.2 km || 
|-id=887 bgcolor=#E9E9E9
| 106887 ||  || — || December 30, 2000 || Socorro || LINEAR || — || align=right | 2.5 km || 
|-id=888 bgcolor=#fefefe
| 106888 ||  || — || December 30, 2000 || Socorro || LINEAR || FLO || align=right | 1.4 km || 
|-id=889 bgcolor=#fefefe
| 106889 ||  || — || December 30, 2000 || Socorro || LINEAR || NYS || align=right | 1.3 km || 
|-id=890 bgcolor=#fefefe
| 106890 ||  || — || December 30, 2000 || Socorro || LINEAR || V || align=right | 1.4 km || 
|-id=891 bgcolor=#d6d6d6
| 106891 ||  || — || December 30, 2000 || Socorro || LINEAR || — || align=right | 7.4 km || 
|-id=892 bgcolor=#fefefe
| 106892 ||  || — || December 30, 2000 || Socorro || LINEAR || FLO || align=right | 1.3 km || 
|-id=893 bgcolor=#fefefe
| 106893 ||  || — || December 30, 2000 || Socorro || LINEAR || V || align=right | 1.3 km || 
|-id=894 bgcolor=#fefefe
| 106894 ||  || — || December 30, 2000 || Socorro || LINEAR || — || align=right | 2.0 km || 
|-id=895 bgcolor=#fefefe
| 106895 ||  || — || December 30, 2000 || Socorro || LINEAR || MAS || align=right | 2.1 km || 
|-id=896 bgcolor=#E9E9E9
| 106896 ||  || — || December 30, 2000 || Socorro || LINEAR || — || align=right | 2.2 km || 
|-id=897 bgcolor=#fefefe
| 106897 ||  || — || December 30, 2000 || Socorro || LINEAR || NYS || align=right | 1.6 km || 
|-id=898 bgcolor=#fefefe
| 106898 ||  || — || December 30, 2000 || Socorro || LINEAR || NYS || align=right | 1.2 km || 
|-id=899 bgcolor=#fefefe
| 106899 ||  || — || December 30, 2000 || Socorro || LINEAR || — || align=right | 1.4 km || 
|-id=900 bgcolor=#fefefe
| 106900 ||  || — || December 30, 2000 || Socorro || LINEAR || V || align=right | 1.6 km || 
|}

106901–107000 

|-bgcolor=#fefefe
| 106901 ||  || — || December 30, 2000 || Socorro || LINEAR || V || align=right | 1.6 km || 
|-id=902 bgcolor=#fefefe
| 106902 ||  || — || December 30, 2000 || Socorro || LINEAR || — || align=right | 1.6 km || 
|-id=903 bgcolor=#E9E9E9
| 106903 ||  || — || December 30, 2000 || Socorro || LINEAR || EUN || align=right | 2.3 km || 
|-id=904 bgcolor=#fefefe
| 106904 ||  || — || December 30, 2000 || Socorro || LINEAR || MAS || align=right | 1.5 km || 
|-id=905 bgcolor=#fefefe
| 106905 ||  || — || December 30, 2000 || Socorro || LINEAR || — || align=right | 1.6 km || 
|-id=906 bgcolor=#fefefe
| 106906 ||  || — || December 30, 2000 || Socorro || LINEAR || — || align=right | 2.1 km || 
|-id=907 bgcolor=#fefefe
| 106907 ||  || — || December 30, 2000 || Socorro || LINEAR || NYS || align=right | 1.3 km || 
|-id=908 bgcolor=#E9E9E9
| 106908 ||  || — || December 30, 2000 || Socorro || LINEAR || — || align=right | 4.4 km || 
|-id=909 bgcolor=#d6d6d6
| 106909 ||  || — || December 30, 2000 || Socorro || LINEAR || — || align=right | 5.0 km || 
|-id=910 bgcolor=#fefefe
| 106910 ||  || — || December 30, 2000 || Socorro || LINEAR || — || align=right | 2.0 km || 
|-id=911 bgcolor=#fefefe
| 106911 ||  || — || December 30, 2000 || Socorro || LINEAR || V || align=right | 1.5 km || 
|-id=912 bgcolor=#fefefe
| 106912 ||  || — || December 30, 2000 || Socorro || LINEAR || FLO || align=right | 1.7 km || 
|-id=913 bgcolor=#fefefe
| 106913 ||  || — || December 30, 2000 || Socorro || LINEAR || — || align=right | 1.6 km || 
|-id=914 bgcolor=#fefefe
| 106914 ||  || — || December 30, 2000 || Socorro || LINEAR || — || align=right | 1.6 km || 
|-id=915 bgcolor=#E9E9E9
| 106915 ||  || — || December 30, 2000 || Socorro || LINEAR || — || align=right | 2.1 km || 
|-id=916 bgcolor=#fefefe
| 106916 ||  || — || December 30, 2000 || Socorro || LINEAR || — || align=right | 1.9 km || 
|-id=917 bgcolor=#E9E9E9
| 106917 ||  || — || December 30, 2000 || Socorro || LINEAR || — || align=right | 2.3 km || 
|-id=918 bgcolor=#fefefe
| 106918 ||  || — || December 30, 2000 || Socorro || LINEAR || CLA || align=right | 3.0 km || 
|-id=919 bgcolor=#fefefe
| 106919 ||  || — || December 30, 2000 || Socorro || LINEAR || CLA || align=right | 4.2 km || 
|-id=920 bgcolor=#fefefe
| 106920 ||  || — || December 30, 2000 || Socorro || LINEAR || — || align=right | 2.4 km || 
|-id=921 bgcolor=#fefefe
| 106921 ||  || — || December 30, 2000 || Socorro || LINEAR || NYS || align=right | 1.1 km || 
|-id=922 bgcolor=#fefefe
| 106922 ||  || — || December 30, 2000 || Socorro || LINEAR || — || align=right | 2.7 km || 
|-id=923 bgcolor=#fefefe
| 106923 ||  || — || December 30, 2000 || Socorro || LINEAR || NYS || align=right | 1.2 km || 
|-id=924 bgcolor=#fefefe
| 106924 ||  || — || December 30, 2000 || Socorro || LINEAR || NYS || align=right | 1.1 km || 
|-id=925 bgcolor=#fefefe
| 106925 ||  || — || December 30, 2000 || Socorro || LINEAR || — || align=right | 1.8 km || 
|-id=926 bgcolor=#fefefe
| 106926 ||  || — || December 30, 2000 || Socorro || LINEAR || NYS || align=right | 1.1 km || 
|-id=927 bgcolor=#fefefe
| 106927 ||  || — || December 30, 2000 || Socorro || LINEAR || MAS || align=right | 1.4 km || 
|-id=928 bgcolor=#fefefe
| 106928 ||  || — || December 30, 2000 || Socorro || LINEAR || V || align=right | 1.6 km || 
|-id=929 bgcolor=#fefefe
| 106929 ||  || — || December 30, 2000 || Socorro || LINEAR || FLO || align=right | 1.5 km || 
|-id=930 bgcolor=#d6d6d6
| 106930 ||  || — || December 30, 2000 || Socorro || LINEAR || — || align=right | 5.2 km || 
|-id=931 bgcolor=#E9E9E9
| 106931 ||  || — || December 30, 2000 || Socorro || LINEAR || — || align=right | 2.1 km || 
|-id=932 bgcolor=#E9E9E9
| 106932 ||  || — || December 30, 2000 || Socorro || LINEAR || — || align=right | 5.0 km || 
|-id=933 bgcolor=#E9E9E9
| 106933 ||  || — || December 29, 2000 || Kitt Peak || Spacewatch || — || align=right | 1.9 km || 
|-id=934 bgcolor=#d6d6d6
| 106934 ||  || — || December 16, 2000 || Kitt Peak || Spacewatch || — || align=right | 5.1 km || 
|-id=935 bgcolor=#fefefe
| 106935 ||  || — || December 30, 2000 || Socorro || LINEAR || — || align=right | 2.0 km || 
|-id=936 bgcolor=#fefefe
| 106936 ||  || — || December 30, 2000 || Kitt Peak || Spacewatch || FLO || align=right | 1.3 km || 
|-id=937 bgcolor=#fefefe
| 106937 ||  || — || December 30, 2000 || Kitt Peak || Spacewatch || — || align=right | 1.7 km || 
|-id=938 bgcolor=#fefefe
| 106938 ||  || — || December 30, 2000 || Socorro || LINEAR || NYS || align=right | 1.4 km || 
|-id=939 bgcolor=#E9E9E9
| 106939 ||  || — || December 30, 2000 || Socorro || LINEAR || — || align=right | 2.7 km || 
|-id=940 bgcolor=#fefefe
| 106940 ||  || — || December 30, 2000 || Socorro || LINEAR || — || align=right | 1.9 km || 
|-id=941 bgcolor=#fefefe
| 106941 ||  || — || December 30, 2000 || Socorro || LINEAR || NYS || align=right | 1.2 km || 
|-id=942 bgcolor=#d6d6d6
| 106942 ||  || — || December 30, 2000 || Socorro || LINEAR || — || align=right | 5.6 km || 
|-id=943 bgcolor=#E9E9E9
| 106943 ||  || — || December 30, 2000 || Socorro || LINEAR || — || align=right | 2.4 km || 
|-id=944 bgcolor=#d6d6d6
| 106944 ||  || — || December 30, 2000 || Socorro || LINEAR || HYG || align=right | 6.3 km || 
|-id=945 bgcolor=#fefefe
| 106945 ||  || — || December 30, 2000 || Socorro || LINEAR || — || align=right data-sort-value="0.94" | 940 m || 
|-id=946 bgcolor=#fefefe
| 106946 ||  || — || December 30, 2000 || Socorro || LINEAR || — || align=right | 1.6 km || 
|-id=947 bgcolor=#fefefe
| 106947 ||  || — || December 30, 2000 || Socorro || LINEAR || NYS || align=right | 1.3 km || 
|-id=948 bgcolor=#d6d6d6
| 106948 ||  || — || December 30, 2000 || Socorro || LINEAR || TIR || align=right | 5.1 km || 
|-id=949 bgcolor=#fefefe
| 106949 ||  || — || December 30, 2000 || Socorro || LINEAR || NYS || align=right | 1.1 km || 
|-id=950 bgcolor=#fefefe
| 106950 ||  || — || December 30, 2000 || Socorro || LINEAR || FLO || align=right | 1.4 km || 
|-id=951 bgcolor=#fefefe
| 106951 ||  || — || December 30, 2000 || Socorro || LINEAR || FLO || align=right | 1.3 km || 
|-id=952 bgcolor=#d6d6d6
| 106952 ||  || — || December 30, 2000 || Socorro || LINEAR || — || align=right | 5.1 km || 
|-id=953 bgcolor=#E9E9E9
| 106953 ||  || — || December 30, 2000 || Socorro || LINEAR || — || align=right | 2.3 km || 
|-id=954 bgcolor=#d6d6d6
| 106954 ||  || — || December 30, 2000 || Socorro || LINEAR || — || align=right | 8.2 km || 
|-id=955 bgcolor=#fefefe
| 106955 ||  || — || December 30, 2000 || Socorro || LINEAR || — || align=right | 1.8 km || 
|-id=956 bgcolor=#fefefe
| 106956 ||  || — || December 30, 2000 || Socorro || LINEAR || NYS || align=right | 1.3 km || 
|-id=957 bgcolor=#E9E9E9
| 106957 ||  || — || December 30, 2000 || Socorro || LINEAR || — || align=right | 2.6 km || 
|-id=958 bgcolor=#fefefe
| 106958 ||  || — || December 30, 2000 || Socorro || LINEAR || — || align=right | 2.6 km || 
|-id=959 bgcolor=#E9E9E9
| 106959 ||  || — || December 30, 2000 || Socorro || LINEAR || — || align=right | 2.2 km || 
|-id=960 bgcolor=#E9E9E9
| 106960 ||  || — || December 30, 2000 || Socorro || LINEAR || — || align=right | 2.0 km || 
|-id=961 bgcolor=#d6d6d6
| 106961 ||  || — || December 30, 2000 || Socorro || LINEAR || — || align=right | 6.6 km || 
|-id=962 bgcolor=#fefefe
| 106962 ||  || — || December 30, 2000 || Socorro || LINEAR || — || align=right | 1.2 km || 
|-id=963 bgcolor=#E9E9E9
| 106963 ||  || — || December 30, 2000 || Socorro || LINEAR || — || align=right | 2.2 km || 
|-id=964 bgcolor=#fefefe
| 106964 ||  || — || December 30, 2000 || Socorro || LINEAR || — || align=right | 1.2 km || 
|-id=965 bgcolor=#fefefe
| 106965 ||  || — || December 30, 2000 || Socorro || LINEAR || NYS || align=right | 1.4 km || 
|-id=966 bgcolor=#fefefe
| 106966 ||  || — || December 30, 2000 || Socorro || LINEAR || NYS || align=right | 1.4 km || 
|-id=967 bgcolor=#fefefe
| 106967 ||  || — || December 30, 2000 || Socorro || LINEAR || — || align=right | 2.7 km || 
|-id=968 bgcolor=#fefefe
| 106968 ||  || — || December 30, 2000 || Socorro || LINEAR || EUT || align=right | 1.4 km || 
|-id=969 bgcolor=#d6d6d6
| 106969 ||  || — || December 30, 2000 || Socorro || LINEAR || HYG || align=right | 7.1 km || 
|-id=970 bgcolor=#fefefe
| 106970 ||  || — || December 30, 2000 || Socorro || LINEAR || MAS || align=right | 1.6 km || 
|-id=971 bgcolor=#d6d6d6
| 106971 ||  || — || December 30, 2000 || Socorro || LINEAR || ALA || align=right | 8.8 km || 
|-id=972 bgcolor=#fefefe
| 106972 ||  || — || December 30, 2000 || Socorro || LINEAR || NYS || align=right | 1.3 km || 
|-id=973 bgcolor=#fefefe
| 106973 ||  || — || December 30, 2000 || Socorro || LINEAR || V || align=right | 1.4 km || 
|-id=974 bgcolor=#fefefe
| 106974 ||  || — || December 30, 2000 || Socorro || LINEAR || MAS || align=right | 1.3 km || 
|-id=975 bgcolor=#fefefe
| 106975 ||  || — || December 30, 2000 || Socorro || LINEAR || NYS || align=right | 1.3 km || 
|-id=976 bgcolor=#fefefe
| 106976 ||  || — || December 30, 2000 || Socorro || LINEAR || V || align=right | 1.3 km || 
|-id=977 bgcolor=#fefefe
| 106977 ||  || — || December 30, 2000 || Socorro || LINEAR || — || align=right | 1.7 km || 
|-id=978 bgcolor=#fefefe
| 106978 ||  || — || December 30, 2000 || Socorro || LINEAR || NYS || align=right | 1.2 km || 
|-id=979 bgcolor=#fefefe
| 106979 ||  || — || December 30, 2000 || Socorro || LINEAR || — || align=right | 1.9 km || 
|-id=980 bgcolor=#fefefe
| 106980 ||  || — || December 30, 2000 || Socorro || LINEAR || — || align=right | 2.0 km || 
|-id=981 bgcolor=#fefefe
| 106981 ||  || — || December 30, 2000 || Socorro || LINEAR || — || align=right | 3.1 km || 
|-id=982 bgcolor=#fefefe
| 106982 ||  || — || December 30, 2000 || Socorro || LINEAR || NYS || align=right | 1.3 km || 
|-id=983 bgcolor=#fefefe
| 106983 ||  || — || December 30, 2000 || Socorro || LINEAR || NYS || align=right | 1.6 km || 
|-id=984 bgcolor=#fefefe
| 106984 ||  || — || December 30, 2000 || Socorro || LINEAR || — || align=right | 1.5 km || 
|-id=985 bgcolor=#fefefe
| 106985 ||  || — || December 30, 2000 || Socorro || LINEAR || — || align=right | 1.7 km || 
|-id=986 bgcolor=#fefefe
| 106986 ||  || — || December 30, 2000 || Socorro || LINEAR || — || align=right | 1.7 km || 
|-id=987 bgcolor=#E9E9E9
| 106987 ||  || — || December 26, 2000 || Haleakala || NEAT || — || align=right | 2.0 km || 
|-id=988 bgcolor=#FA8072
| 106988 ||  || — || December 29, 2000 || Anderson Mesa || LONEOS || — || align=right | 3.3 km || 
|-id=989 bgcolor=#d6d6d6
| 106989 ||  || — || December 28, 2000 || Socorro || LINEAR || — || align=right | 8.2 km || 
|-id=990 bgcolor=#fefefe
| 106990 ||  || — || December 28, 2000 || Socorro || LINEAR || — || align=right | 1.9 km || 
|-id=991 bgcolor=#fefefe
| 106991 ||  || — || December 28, 2000 || Socorro || LINEAR || — || align=right | 2.2 km || 
|-id=992 bgcolor=#E9E9E9
| 106992 ||  || — || December 28, 2000 || Socorro || LINEAR || MAR || align=right | 2.0 km || 
|-id=993 bgcolor=#fefefe
| 106993 ||  || — || December 28, 2000 || Socorro || LINEAR || — || align=right | 5.5 km || 
|-id=994 bgcolor=#fefefe
| 106994 ||  || — || December 30, 2000 || Socorro || LINEAR || FLO || align=right | 1.6 km || 
|-id=995 bgcolor=#fefefe
| 106995 ||  || — || December 30, 2000 || Socorro || LINEAR || NYS || align=right | 1.7 km || 
|-id=996 bgcolor=#fefefe
| 106996 ||  || — || December 30, 2000 || Socorro || LINEAR || MAS || align=right | 1.3 km || 
|-id=997 bgcolor=#fefefe
| 106997 ||  || — || December 30, 2000 || Socorro || LINEAR || FLO || align=right | 1.5 km || 
|-id=998 bgcolor=#fefefe
| 106998 ||  || — || December 30, 2000 || Socorro || LINEAR || V || align=right | 1.6 km || 
|-id=999 bgcolor=#fefefe
| 106999 ||  || — || December 30, 2000 || Socorro || LINEAR || — || align=right | 1.8 km || 
|-id=000 bgcolor=#fefefe
| 107000 ||  || — || December 30, 2000 || Socorro || LINEAR || — || align=right | 2.4 km || 
|}

References

External links 
 Discovery Circumstances: Numbered Minor Planets (105001)–(110000) (IAU Minor Planet Center)

0106